Editions of the word board game Scrabble in different languages have differing letter distributions of the tiles, because the frequency of each letter of the alphabet is different for every language. As a general rule, the rarer the letter, the more points it is worth.

Most languages use sets of 100 tiles, since the original distribution of ninety-eight tiles was later augmented with two blank tiles. In tournament play, while it is acceptable to pause the game to count the tiles remaining in the game, it is not acceptable to mention how many tiles are remaining at any time. Several online tools exist for counting tiles during friendly play.

Official editions

Scrabble editions listed in this section are officially licensed by Hasbro (for North America) or Mattel (for the rest of the world).

English

English-language editions of Scrabble contain 100 letter tiles, in the following distribution:

2 blank tiles (scoring 0 points)
1 point: E ×12, A ×9, I ×9, O ×8, N ×6, R ×6, T ×6, L ×4, S ×4, U ×4
2 points: D ×4, G ×3
3 points: B ×2, C ×2, M ×2, P ×2
4 points: F ×2, H ×2, V ×2, W ×2, Y ×2
5 points: K ×1
8 points: J ×1, X ×1
10 points: Q ×1, Z ×1

The total number of points is 187. Diacritical marks (such as "é" in words borrowed from French) are ignored.

When Alfred Butts invented the game, he initially experimented with different distributions of letters. A popular story claims that Butts created an elaborate chart by studying the front page of The New York Times to create his final choice of letter distributions.

In 2004, Super Scrabble was launched. For international distribution outside the United States and Canada, and under license from Mattel, the game is manufactured by Leisure Tends' Tinderbox Games; and, for distribution within the United States and Canada, under license from Hasbro, the game is manufactured by Winning Moves. This set is composed of 200 tiles:

4 blank tiles (scoring 0 points)
1 point: E ×24, A ×16, O ×15, T ×15, I ×13, N ×13, R ×13, S ×10, L ×7, U ×7
2 points: D ×8, G ×5
3 points: C ×6, M ×6, B ×4, P ×4
4 points: H ×5, F ×4, W ×4, Y ×4, V ×3
5 points: K ×2
8 points: J ×2, X ×2
10 points: Q ×2, Z ×2

Super Scrabble contains more letters that are overlined and fewer letters that are underlined than would be obtained by combining two standard English sets.

Afrikaans

The Afrikaans editions use these 104 tiles:

2 blank tiles (scoring 0 points)
1 point:  E ×16, A ×9, I ×8, N ×8, D ×6, O ×6, R ×6, S ×6, T ×6
2 points: G ×4, H ×3, L ×3
3 points: K ×3, W ×3
4 points: M ×2, U ×2, Y ×2
5 points: P ×2, V ×2
8 points: B ×1, F ×1
10 points: J ×1

Circa 1953, the Production and Marketing Company had provided license to the private company Leon Toys of Johannesburg, South Africa in the manufacture and production of Scrabble. Alongside the English language version of Scrabble the company also produced the first Afrikaans language version of the game under the name Krabbel, an Afrikaans translation of "Scrabble". This language set of the game had the following 100 tiles:

2 blank tiles (scoring 0 points)
1 point:  E ×15, A ×9, I ×8, N ×7, O ×6, S ×6, T ×6,  R ×5, L ×4, U ×2 
2 points: D ×6, G ×4 
3 points: B ×2, P ×2, M ×1
4 points: H ×3, F ×2, V ×2, W ×2, Y ×2
5 points: K ×3  
8 points: J ×1

Absent in both the original and standard set of Afrikaans are the letters C, Q, X, and Z. The infrequent X and Z may still be represented by the use of a blank, yet the letters C and Q, not used in Afrikaans but only in a few loanwords, may not be.

Arabic

Arabic-language editions use the following 100 tiles:

2 blank tiles (scoring 0 points)
1 point: ﺍ‎ ×8, ﻝ‎ ×4, ﺝ‎ ×4, ﺡ‎ ×3, ﺥ‎ ×3, ﻡ‎ ×3, ﻥ‎ ×3, ﻩ‎ ×3, ﻭ‎ ×3, ي‎ ×3
2 points: ﺏ‎ ×4, ﺕ‎ ×4, ﺭ‎ ×3, ﺩ‎ ×3, ﺱ‎ ×3, ﺙ‎ ×3, 
3 points: ﻑ‎ ×3, ﻕ‎ ×3, ﺫ‎ ×3, ﺵ‎ ×3, ﺯ‎ ×3
4 points: ﺹ‎ ×3, ﺽ‎ ×3, ﻉ‎ ×3, ﻙ‎ ×3, ﻁ‎ ×2,
5 points: ﻅ‎ ×2
6 points: ﺉ‎ ×2
8 points: ﻍ‎ ×2, ﺀ‎ ×2
10 points: ﺃ‎ ×2, ﺅ‎ ×2,

Although Arabic letters have up to four forms, Scrabble tiles use the isolated form. In some sets, as found in some Arabic-based alphabets that are not the standard modern Arabic, a dotless yeh (alif maqsura) may be used ى‎, and for the letter he the final form ‎ھ (heh doachashmee) may appear, as it is in some Arabic-based alphabets, as in Urdu, the isolated form of the letter. The pattern of using the isolated forms in composing words is also found in Arabic crosswords and in the Scrabble3D Persian Scrabble set and is one of the rare situations when Arabic letters are not connected to each other.

Bulgarian

Bulgarian-language Scrabble sets, which use Cyrillic letters, use the following 102 tiles:

2 blank tiles (scoring 0 points)
1 point: А ×9, О ×9, Е ×8, И ×8, Т ×5, Н ×4, П ×4, Р ×4, С ×4
2 points: В ×4, Д ×4, М ×4, Б ×3, К ×3, Л ×3
3 points: Г ×3, Ъ ×2
4 points: Ж ×2, З ×2
5 points: У ×3, Ч ×2, Я ×2, Й ×1, Х ×1
8 points: Ц ×1, Ш ×1, Ю ×1
10 points: Ф ×1, Щ ×1, Ь ×1

Catalan

Catalan-language editions use these 100 tiles:

2 blank tiles (scoring 0 points)
1 point: E ×13, A ×12, I ×8, R ×8, S ×8, N ×6, O ×5, T ×5, L ×4, U ×4
2 points: C ×3, D ×3, M ×3
3 points: B ×2, G ×2, P ×2
4 points: F ×1, V ×1
8 points: H ×1, J ×1, Q ×1, Z ×1
10 points: Ç ×1, L·L ×1, NY ×1, X ×1

Nevertheless, there are special tiles for the C with cedilla Ç (ce trencada), the ligature L·L representing the geminated L (ela geminada), as well as the digraph NY. K, W, and Y are absent because they are only used in loanwords or, for Y, the digraph NY. Blanks cannot be used to represent K, W, or Y, which means that playing an N tile followed by a blank tile to form the digraph NY is not allowed. Official rules treat the Q tile as just one letter, but usually Catalan players use the Q tile like the QU digraph and all Catalan Scrabble Clubs use this de facto rule. While Ç is a separate tile, other diacritic marks are ignored.

There is a Catalan Scrabble clone which uses the same 21x21 board as Super Scrabble.
 It includes the following 200 tiles, with the Q tile replaced with the QU digraph, because Q in Catalan is never without a U after it, and with two of the special tiles, Ç and L·L, increased in value:
5 wild (asterisk) tiles scoring 0 points
1 point: E ×27, A ×25, S ×19, I ×17, R ×16, N ×12, O ×10, T ×10, L ×8, U ×6
2 points: M ×7, C ×5, D ×5
3 points: B ×3, G ×3, P ×3
4 points: F ×2, V ×2
8 points: H ×2, J ×2, QU ×2, Z ×2
10 points: NY ×2, X ×2
12 points: Ç ×2
15 points: L·L ×1

Croatian

Croatian-language Scrabble sets use the following 103 tiles:

2 blank tiles (scoring 0 points)
1 point: A ×11, I ×10, E ×9, O ×9, N ×6, R ×5, S ×5, T ×5, J ×4, U ×4
2 points: K ×3, M ×3, P ×3, V ×3
3 points: D ×3, G ×2, L ×2, Z ×2, B ×1, Č ×1
4 points: C ×1, H ×1, LJ ×1, NJ ×1, Š ×1, Ž ×1
5 points: Ć ×1
8 points: F ×1
10 points: DŽ ×1, Đ ×1
Q, W, X and Y are not included, as Croatian does not use those letters.

Czech

Czech-language sets use the following 100 tiles:

2 blank tiles (scoring 0 points)
1 point:  O ×6, A ×5, E ×5, N ×5, I ×4, S ×4, T ×4, V ×4, D ×3, K ×3, L ×3, P ×3, R ×3
2 points:  C ×3, H ×3, Í ×3, M ×3, U ×3, Á ×2, J ×2, Y ×2, Z ×2
3 points: B ×2, É ×2, Ě ×2
4 points: Ř ×2, Š ×2, Ý ×2, Č ×1, Ů ×1, Ž ×1
5 points: F ×1, G ×1, Ú ×1
6 points: Ň ×1
7 points: Ó ×1, Ť ×1
8 points: Ď ×1
10 points: X ×1

Q and W are absent because they are only used in loanwords, though Q and W can be played with a blank. X is also used only in loanwords, but it is more frequent than Q and W, so it is included. The digraphic letter CH does not appear in this edition and is not representable by the blank (joker); CH is instead played as two distinct letters C and H.

Prior to 1993, there was no official Czech Scrabble. Instead, there was a Scrabble clone called Pismenkovka which was created in the 1970s, which had a CH tile. Pismenkovka sets contain these tiles:

2 blank tiles (scoring 0 points) 
1 point: A ×6, O ×6, E ×5, S ×5, I ×4, K ×4, L ×4, R ×4, N ×3, P ×3, T ×3, V ×3, Y ×3
2 points:  M ×3, U ×3, Á ×2, B ×2, D ×2, Í ×2, J ×2
3 points: C ×2, H ×2, Š ×2, Z ×2
4 points: Č ×2, CH ×2, Ř ×2, Ž ×2
5 points: Ě ×2, É ×1, Ů ×1, Ý ×1
6 points: Ň ×1, Ť ×1, Ú ×1
8 points: Ď ×1, F ×1, G ×1
10 points: Ó ×1, X ×1

Originally this set did not include an X tile (because it is only used in loanwords) and instead had a seventh O tile.

KrisKros Klasik has a similar distribution, but it includes 4 T tiles and 2 X tiles.

Danish

Danish-language Scrabble sets use these 100 tiles:

2 blank tiles (scoring 0 points)
1 point:  E ×9, A ×7, N ×6, R ×6
2 points: D ×5, L ×5, O ×5, S ×5, T ×5
3 points: B ×4, I ×4, K ×4, F ×3, G ×3, M ×3, U ×3, V ×3
4 points: H ×2, J ×2, P ×2, Y ×2, Æ ×2, Ø ×2, Å ×2
8 points: C ×2, X ×1, Z ×1

The distribution lacks Q and W, which are very rare and only occur in foreign words. C, X, and Z also only occur in foreign words, but they are not so rare, so they were included.

Dutch

Dutch-language editions consist of the following 102 tiles:

2 blank tiles (scoring 0 points)
1 point: E ×18, N ×10, A ×6, O ×6, I ×4
2 points: D ×5, R ×5, S ×5, T ×5
3 points: G ×3, K ×3, L ×3, M ×3, B ×2, P ×2
4 points: U ×3, F ×2, H ×2, J ×2, V ×2, Z ×2
5 points: C ×2, W ×2
8 points: X ×1, Y ×1
10 points: Q ×1

Before March 1998, there was a difference between the Dutch and the Flemish version: the Dutch version had 2 IJ tiles with a value of 4 points. Furthermore, it had only 1 F and only 4 S tiles. The Flemish version never had IJ tiles, it was as described above. The Dutch version is now in line with the Flemish one. Instead of the
IJ letter a combination of the I and J is now used.

Another Dutch version before March 1998 consisted of these 100 tiles:

2 blank tiles (scoring 0 points)
1 point: E ×16, N ×8, A ×6, O ×6, I ×4
2 points: D ×5, R ×5, S ×5, T ×5
3 points: K ×3, L ×3, M ×3, P ×3, B ×2, G ×2
4 points: U ×4, F ×2, H ×2, J ×2, V ×2, IJ ×2, Z ×2
5 points: C ×2, W ×2
8 points: X ×1
10 points: Q ×1

The original Dutch version consisted of these 102 tiles:

2 blank tiles (scoring 0 points)
1 point: E ×18, N ×10, A ×6, I ×6, O ×6, R ×6, T ×6, D ×5, S ×3
2 points: G ×4, H ×3, L ×3
3 points: B ×2, C ×2, M ×2, P ×2
4 points: J ×2, K ×2, U ×2, V ×2, W ×2
5 points: F ×1
6 points: Z ×2
8 points: X ×1, Y ×1
10 points: Q ×1

Estonian

Estonian-language editions consist of the following 102 tiles:

2 blank tiles (scoring 0 points)
1 point: A ×10, E ×9, I ×9, S ×8, T ×7, K ×5, L ×5, O ×5, U ×5
2 point: D ×4, M ×4, N ×4, R ×2
3 point: G ×2, V ×2
4 point: H ×2, J ×2, P ×2, Õ ×2, B ×1
5 point: Ä ×2, Ü ×2
6 point: Ö ×2
8 point: F ×1
10 point: Š ×1, Z ×1, Ž ×1

C, Q, W, X and Y are absent because these letters are only used in foreign words and are not an official part of the alphabet. Arguably F, Š, Z and Ž do not exist either, but they were included so that loanwords can be played.

Faroese

Faroese-language editions, created in 2010 as "Krossorðaspæl", consist of the following 102 tiles:
2 blank tiles (scoring 0 points)
1 point: A ×10, I ×10, E ×7, N ×7, R ×7, T ×7, S ×5, U ×5
2 points: Ð ×4, G ×4, K ×4, L ×4, V ×4
3 points: M ×3
4 points: D ×2, F ×2, H ×2, O ×2
5 points: Á ×1
6 points: B ×1, Í ×1, J ×1, Ó ×1, Ú ×1 
7 points: Y ×1, Ø ×1
8 points: P ×1, Ý ×1, Æ ×1

An earlier, unofficial, Faroese-language edition consisted of the following 105 tiles:

2 blank tiles (scoring 0 points)
1 point: A ×11, I ×10, N ×8, R ×8, T ×7, E ×6, S ×5, U ×5
2 points: G ×4, K ×4, L ×4, M ×4, V ×4
3 points: Ð ×3, O ×3, F ×2, H ×2
4 points: B ×2, D ×2
5 points: Í ×1, J ×1, P ×1, Y ×1
6 points: Á ×1, Ó ×1, Ø ×1
8 points: Æ ×1, Ú ×1
10 points: Ý ×1

C, Q, W, X, and Z are absent since these letters are not used in modern standard Faroese.

Finnish

Finnish-language sets use these 101 tiles:

2 blank tiles (scoring 0 points)
1 point: A ×10, I ×10, N ×9, T ×9, E ×8, S ×7
2 points: K ×5, L ×5, O ×5, Ä ×5
3 points: U ×4, M ×3
4 points: H ×2, J ×2, P ×2, R ×2, V ×2, Y ×2
7 points: D ×1, Ö ×1
8 points: B ×1, F ×1, G ×1, W ×1
10 points: C ×1

This distribution lacks Q, Š, X, Z, Ž, and Å, since they are virtually absent in Finnish. W was not originally present in the distribution, but it was added by 2019. Arguably B, C, F, G (outside the digraph NG), and W do not exist in Finnish either, but they are included as they are used for borrowed words, and F in some western dialects.

Before 2019, a distribution without the W and with 100 tiles was used:

2 blank tiles (scoring 0 points)
1 point: A ×10, I ×10, N ×9, T ×9, E ×8, S ×7
2 points: K ×5, L ×5, O ×5, Ä ×5
3 points: U ×4, M ×3
4 points: H ×2, J ×2, P ×2, R ×2, V ×2, Y ×2
7 points: D ×1, Ö ×1
8 points: B ×1, F ×1, G ×1
10 points: C ×1

A variant called Alfapet (originally the name of Swedish Scrabble), contains 108 tiles:

2 blank tiles (scoring 0 points), 2 black tiles (scoring 0 points), 2 left-pointing arrows, 2 right-pointing arrows
1 point: A ×9, I ×9, T ×9, N ×8, E ×7, S ×7, K ×6, L ×6, O ×6
2 points: M ×5, U ×5, Ä ×5, P ×4, R ×4, V ×4
3 points: H ×3, J ×3, Y ×3
4 points: D ×2, Ö ×2, G ×1
6 points: B ×1, F ×1
8 points: C ×1

The old Alfapet distribution was as follows:

2 blank tiles (scoring 0 points), 2 black tiles (scoring 0 points), 2 left-pointing arrows, 2 right-pointing arrows
1 point: A ×10, T ×10, I ×8, N ×8, E ×7, S ×7, Ä ×6
2 points: D ×5, K ×5, L ×5, O ×5, R ×5, U ×5, M ×4
3 points: B ×3, G ×3
4 points: F ×2, H ×2, J ×2, P ×2, V ×2, Ö ×2
8 points: C ×2, Y ×2

French

French-language editions of Scrabble contain these 102 tiles:
2 blank tiles (scoring 0 points)
1 point: E ×15, A ×9, I ×8, N ×6, O ×6, R ×6, S ×6, T ×6, U ×6, L ×5
2 points: D ×3, M ×3, G ×2
3 points: B ×2, C ×2, P ×2
4 points: F ×2, H ×2, V ×2
8 points: J ×1, Q ×1
10 points: K ×1, W ×1, X ×1, Y ×1, Z ×1
Diacritical marks are ignored.

German

German-language editions of Scrabble contain 102 letter tiles, in the following distribution:

 2 blank tiles (scoring 0 points)
1 point: E ×15, N ×9, S ×7, I ×6, R ×6, T ×6, U ×6, A ×5, D ×4
2 points: H ×4, G ×3, L ×3, O ×3
3 points: M ×4, B ×2, W ×1, Z ×1
4 points: C ×2, F ×2, K ×2, P ×1
6 points: Ä ×1, J ×1, Ü ×1, V ×1
8 points: Ö ×1, X ×1
10 points: Q ×1, Y ×1

One user on Scrabble3D proposed adding one A, one L, and one P, and removing one D, one M, and one U for balance in the main 102-tile distribution. The fifth U is kept to make the Q playable. The "Alternative distribution" adds one A and one P and removed one D and one U to the 102-tile distribution.

Another user on Scrabble3D proposed adding the letter ẞ, worth 8 points, removing an S tile, and decreasing the value of the Y. Percentages of each letter were shown in the dictionary, and a new distribution was established, still with 102 tiles. The resulting distribution has been implemented as the "Eszett" distribution:

 2 blank tiles (scoring 0 points)
1 point: E ×16, N ×8, R ×7, T ×7, A ×6, S ×6, I ×5
2 points: U ×5, H ×4, L ×4, D ×3, O ×3, B ×2, G ×2
3 points: M ×3, F ×2, K ×2, P ×2
4 points: Ä ×1, Ö ×1, W ×1, Z ×1
6 points: C ×2, J ×1, X ×1, Y ×1
8 points: Ü ×1, V ×1, ẞ ×1
10 points: Q ×1

Before the current 102-tile set, German language sets had 119 tiles. With the larger sized tile pool, players had eight tiles at a time on their racks, as opposed to the standard seven. The letter distribution for this larger set is:

 2 blank tiles (scoring 0 points)
1 point: E ×16, N ×10, I ×9, S ×8, R ×7, A ×6, D ×6, U ×6
2 points: H ×5, T ×5, C ×4, L ×4, O ×4, G ×3, W ×2
3 points: M ×4, F ×3, B ×2, K ×2, Z ×2
4 points: P ×1, V ×1
5 points: Ü ×1
6 points: Ä ×1, J ×1
8 points: Ö ×1, X ×1
10 points: Q ×1, Y ×1

German sets marketed as Foreign Language Editions produced by Selchow & Righter had 100 tiles with the following distribution:

 2 blank tiles (scoring 0 points)
1 point: E ×12, I ×8, N ×7, A ×6, S ×6, R ×5, T ×5, O ×3, U ×3
2 points: C ×4, D ×4, H ×4, G ×3, L ×3, Ä ×1, Ö ×1, Ü ×1
3 points: M ×3, B ×2, F ×2, K ×2, P ×2
4 points: Z ×3, V ×2, W ×2
8 points: J ×1
10 points: Q ×1, X ×1, Y ×1

In the mid-1950s, licensed by James Brunot's Production and Marketing Company, the wooden-toy company J. Schowanek KG. of Piding (Bavaria), Germany produced the earliest German-language edition with a different 100-tile distribution:

 2 blank tiles (scoring 0 points)
1 point: E ×14, I ×8, N ×8, A ×6, R ×6, S ×6, T ×6, O ×3, U ×3
2 points: D ×4, G ×3, L ×3, Ä ×1, Ö ×1, Ü ×1
3 points: H ×3, M ×3, B ×2, C ×2, F ×2, K ×2, P ×2
4 points: V ×2, W ×2
8 points: J ×1, Y ×1, Z ×1
10 points: Q ×1, X ×1

In 2008, a German edition of the Mattel-licensed product, Super Scrabble, was released by the game publisher Piatnik. The set is composed of the following 200 tiles:
 
4 blank tiles (scoring 0 points)
1 point: E ×29, N ×17, S ×14, I ×11, R ×11, T ×12, U ×12, A ×10, D ×8
2 points: H ×8, G ×6, L ×6, O ×6
3 points: M ×8, B ×4, W ×2, Z ×2
4 points: C ×4, F ×4, K ×4, P ×2
6 points: Ä ×2, J ×2, Ü ×2, V ×2
8 points: Ö ×2, X ×2
10 points: Q ×2, Y ×2
The underlines indicate the distribution contains one tile fewer for the letter than would be if the 102 tiles of the current language set were simply doubled. Scrabble3D allows a special "Alternative distribution", which adds two A's one P and removes one D and two U's.

Note that the quasi-letter ß (Eszett) is not used in any distribution except for the new Scrabble3D one. This is because its capital version did not exist officially in standard German orthography prior to 2017 and the letter itself is unused in Switzerland and Liechtenstein. Instead, the character is substituted by SS. However, the umlauts Ä, Ö and Ü must not be replaced by AE, OE or UE when playing (as would usually be done in German crosswords where ß is also replaced by SS). Other diacritics, which may occur in some foreign words, are ignored (é = E, œ = OE etc.).

Greek

Greek-language editions of Scrabble contain 104 tiles:

2 blank tiles (scoring 0 points)
1 point: Α ×12, Ο ×9, Ε ×8, Ι ×8, Τ ×8, Η ×7, Σ ×7, Ν ×6
2 points: Ρ ×5, Κ ×4, Π ×4, Υ ×4
3 points: Λ ×3, Μ ×3, Ω ×3
4 points: Γ ×2, Δ ×2
8 points: Β ×1, Φ ×1, Χ ×1
10 points: Ζ ×1, Θ ×1, Ξ ×1, Ψ ×1

Hebrew

Four different Hebrew  language distributions were published by the owners or licensees of the Scrabble brand. In these sets the final form letters ך, ם, ן, ף and ץ are not available and the normal form is used.

The most recent edition for Hebrew was published in 2008 by J. W. Spear & Sons, a subsidiary of Mattel UK with 100 tiles in the following distribution:

2 blank tiles (scoring 0 points)
 1 point: ו‎ ×12, י‎ ×10, ה‎ ×8,  ת‎ ×8, ר‎ ×8 
 2 points: א‎ ×6,  ל‎ ×6, מ‎ ×6, ש‎ ×6
 3 points: ב‎ ×4, ד‎ ×4
 4 points: נ‎ ×3, פ‎ ×3 
 5 points: ח‎ ×3, כ‎ ×2, ק‎ ×2
 8 points: ע‎ ×2, ג‎ ×1, ז‎ ×1, ט‎ ×1, ס‎ ×1, צ‎ ×1

A version produced in the late 1980s by J. W. Spear & Sons under the Spears Games label has these 104 tiles:

2 blank tiles (scoring 0 points)
 1 point: ו‎ ×12, י‎ ×10, ת‎ ×9, ה‎ ×8,  ר‎ ×8
 2 points: א‎ ×6,  ל‎ ×6, מ‎ ×6, ש‎ ×6
 3 points: ב‎ ×4, ד‎ ×4, נ‎ ×4
 4 points: ח‎ ×3, פ‎ ×3, ק‎ ×3
 5 points: ע‎ ×2, כ‎ ×2, ג‎ ×2
 8 points:  צ‎ ×2, ז‎ ×1, ט‎ ×1, ס‎ ×1

In 1977 J. W. Spear & Sons published their original 97-tile Hebrew language version under the tradename נא‎-שבץ‎™ (Hebrew: "Scrabble"):
 
2 blank tiles (scoring 0 points)
 1 point: ו‎ ×12, י‎ ×10, ה‎ ×9, ת‎ ×8, ר‎ ×8 
 2 points: ל‎ ×6, מ‎ ×6, ש‎ ×6
 3 points: ב‎ ×4, ד‎ ×4, א‎ ×3
 4 points: נ‎ ×3, פ‎ ×3 
 5 points: ח‎ ×2, כ‎ ×2, ע‎ ×2, ק‎ ×2
 8 points:  ג‎ ×1, ז‎ ×1, ט‎ ×1, ס‎ ×1, צ‎ ×1

Just two years earlier, in 1975, Selchow & Righter released their Foreign Language Edition of Hebrew with the following 98-tile distribution:

2 blank tiles (scoring 0 points)
 1 point: ו‎ ×12, י‎ ×10, ת‎ ×9, ה‎ ×8, ר‎ ×8 
 2 points:,  ל‎ ×6, מ‎ ×6, ש‎ ×6
 3 points: א‎ ×4, ב‎ ×4, ד‎ ×4 
 4 points: נ‎ ×3, פ‎ ×3 
 5 points: ח‎ ×2, כ‎ ×2, ע‎ ×2, ק‎ ×2
 8 points:  ג‎ ×1, ז‎ ×1, ט‎ ×1, ס‎ ×1, צ‎ ×1

Hungarian

Hungarian-language sets use these 100 tiles:

2 blank tiles (scoring 0 points)
1 point: A ×6, E ×6, K ×6, T ×5, Á ×4, L ×4, N ×4, R ×4, I ×3, M ×3, O ×3, S ×3
2 points: B ×3, D ×3, G ×3, Ó ×3
3 points: É ×3, H ×2, SZ ×2, V ×2
4 points: F ×2, GY ×2, J ×2, Ö ×2, P ×2, U ×2, Ü ×2, Z ×2
5 points: C ×1, Í ×1, NY ×1
7 points: CS ×1, Ő ×1, Ú ×1, Ű ×1
8 points: LY ×1, ZS ×1
10 points: TY ×1

DZ and DZS, which are fairly rare in Hungarian, have no tiles, nor do Q, W, X and Y (outside the digraphs "GY", "LY", "NY" and "TY"), which are only used in loanwords, as part of the extended Hungarian alphabet. You can still use a blank as a Q, W, X or Y, but not as DZ or DZS. Using a D tile and a Z tile to make DZ is not allowed, and neither is putting together D, Z and S or D and ZS to make DZS.

Icelandic

In 2016, Tinderbox games under license from Mattel produced Icelandic-language sets using these 104 tiles:

2 blank tiles (scoring 0 points)
1 point: A ×10,  N ×8, R ×8, I ×7, E ×6, S ×6, U ×6, T ×5
2 points: Ð ×4, G ×4, L ×4
3 points: M ×4, F ×3, K ×3,
4 points: Á ×2, D ×2,  H ×2, Í ×2, O ×2, V ×2
5 points: Þ ×1
6 points: B ×1, J ×1, Ó ×1, Y ×1, Æ ×1
8 points: É ×1, P ×1, Ú ×1, Ö ×1
9 points: Ý ×1
10 points: X ×1

Earlier in 2016, to address a realized need for an improved letter distribution for the Icelandic-language, sets under the name Krafla, independent of the Scrabble brand, were produced and made available. From that year, this version has been sanctioned by Iceland's Scrabble clubs for their tournaments and for the national championship. Netskrafl (meaning "Net Scrabble"), a popular online crossword game website, supports the Krafla distribution. Krafla has the following 100 tiles:

2 blank tiles (scoring 0 points)
1 point: A ×11, R ×8, I ×7, N ×7, S ×7
2 points: T ×6, U ×6, L ×5, Ð ×4, K ×4, M ×3
3 points: E ×3, F ×3, G ×3, Á ×2, Ó ×2
4 points: Æ ×2, H ×1, Í ×1, Ú ×1
5 points: B ×1, D ×1, O ×1, P ×1, V ×1, Ý ×1
6 points: J ×1, Y ×1, Ö ×1
7 points: É ×1,  Þ ×1
10 points: X ×1

Before 2016, Icelandic-language sets used these 104 tiles:

2 blank tiles (scoring 0 points)
1 point: A ×10, I ×8, N ×8, R ×7, E ×6, S ×6, U ×6, T ×5
2 points: Ð ×5, G ×4, K ×3, L ×3, M ×3
3 points: F ×3, O ×3, H ×2, V ×2
4 points: Á ×2, D ×2, Í ×2, Þ ×1
5 points: J ×1, Æ ×1
6 points: B ×1, É ×1, Ó ×1
7 points: Y ×1, Ö ×1
8 points: P ×1, Ú ×1
9 points: Ý ×1
10 points: X ×1

Originally, there were 105 tiles in this set, as there were 7 E's instead of 6.

C, Q, W, and Z are absent in all distributions since Icelandic does not use those letters.

Indonesian

Indonesian-language sets use these 100 tiles:

2 blank tiles (scoring 0 points)
1 point: A ×19, N ×9, E ×8, I ×8, T ×5, U ×5, R ×4, O ×3, S ×3
2 points: K ×3, M ×3
3 points: D ×4, G ×3
4 points: L ×3, H ×2, P ×2
5 points: B ×4, Y ×2, F ×1, V ×1
8 points: C ×3, W ×1
10 points: J ×1, Z ×1

Q, and X, are absent because they are only present in loanwords and are very rare. F, V, and Z are also present only in loanwords, but they are not very rare, so they are included.

Irish

Irish-language sets use these 100 tiles:

2 blank tiles (scoring 0 points)
1 point: A ×13, H ×10, I ×10, N ×7, R ×7, E ×6, S ×6
2 points: C ×4, D ×4, L ×4, O ×4, T ×4, G ×3, U ×3
4 points: Á ×2, F ×2, Í ×2, M ×2
8 points: É ×1, Ó ×1, Ú ×1
10 points: B ×1, P ×1

J, K, Q, V, W, X, Y, and Z are absent since they do not belong to the standard Irish alphabet, although they are sometimes used in loanwords.

An alternate set, proposed by Scrabble3D along with the official set, was proposed to have these 100 tiles:

2 blank tiles (scoring 0 points)
1 point: A ×13, I ×10, N ×6, R ×6, E ×5, L ×5, O ×5, Í ×4, S ×4, T ×4
2 points: Á ×4, C ×3, Ċ ×3, D ×3, M ×3, G ×2
3 points: F ×2, Ó ×2, Ṫ ×1
4 points: U ×2, Ḃ ×1, Ḋ ×1, É ×1, Ġ ×1, Ú ×1
5 points: B ×1, Ṁ ×1
8 points: P ×1, Ṡ ×1
10 points: Ḟ ×1, Ṗ ×1
Note that H is not in this set because it is only used at the beginning of the words starting with vowels, which is against the rules there. Note: This set uses the old orthography. In the new orthography, the dotted letters are replaced by the digraph of the letter without the dot followed by H.

Shortly after, the Scrabble3D distribution underwent a major revision (still has 100 tiles):

2 blank tiles (scoring 0 points)
1 point: A ×11, I ×8, Á ×5, Í ×5, L ×5, N ×5, R ×5, E ×4, O ×4, S ×4
2 points: C ×3, Ċ ×3, D ×3, G ×3, M ×3, Ó ×3, T ×3, Ú ×3
3 points: B ×2, Ḃ ×2, É ×2, Ṫ ×2, U ×2
4 points: Ḋ ×1, F ×1, Ġ ×1
5 points: Ṁ ×1
8 points: P ×1, Ṡ ×1
10 points: Ḟ ×1, Ṗ ×1
Note that H is not in this set because it is only used at the beginning of the words starting with vowels, which is against the rules there. Note: This set uses the old orthography. In the new orthography, the dotted letters are replaced by the digraph of the letter without the dot followed by H.

Italian

Italian-language Scrabble applied a special rule that when a player exchanges tiles on his turn, he could request opponent to pass his turn. Both players have one chance each for one game. The sets consist of these 120 tiles:

2 blank tiles (scoring 0 points)
1 point: O ×15, A ×14, I ×12, E ×11
2 points: C ×6, R ×6, S ×6, T ×6
3 points: L ×5, M ×5, N ×5, U ×5
5 points: B ×3, D ×3, F ×3, P ×3, V ×3
8 points: G ×2, H ×2, Z ×2
10 points: Q ×1

Diacritic marks are ignored. The letters J, K, W, X, and Y are absent since these letters do not exist in the standard Italian alphabet, although they are sometimes used in loanwords. However, you can still use a blank to represent these five absent letters.

Prior to the 1980s, Italian scrabble was called "Scalaparola", and the sets included these 120 tiles:

2 blank tiles (scoring 0 points)
1 point: A ×13, E ×13, I ×13, O ×13
2 points: N ×6, R ×6, S ×6, T ×6
3 points: L ×5, M ×5,  U ×5
4 points: C ×4, V ×4
5 points: B ×3, D ×3, G ×3, P ×3
8 points: F ×2, H ×2, Z ×2
10 points: Q ×1

Scarabeo is an Italian variant of Scrabble that is much more popular in its native country than the original game. It is played with a 17×17 board, and uses these 130 tiles:

2 scarab tiles (wildcards) scoring 0 points
1 point: A ×12, E ×12, I ×12, O ×12, C ×7, R ×7, S ×7, T ×7
2 points: L ×6, M ×6, N ×6
3 points: P ×4
4 points: B ×4, D ×4, F ×4, G ×4, U ×4, V ×4
8 points: H ×2, Z ×2
10 points: Q ×2

In 1948, Selchow & Righter released their Foreign Language Edition of Italian with the following 120-tile distribution:
2 blank tiles (scoring 0 points)
1 point: A ×10, E ×10, I ×10, O ×10, R ×7, S ×7, T ×7
2 points: C ×6, N ×6, L ×5
3 points: M ×5, D ×4, P ×4
4 points: B ×4, F ×4, G ×4, U ×4, V ×4
8 points: Z ×3, H ×2
10 points: Q ×2

By 1976, the distribution was changed to match Scalaparola.

Latin

There are four kinds of Latin-language Scrabble sets developed by four authorities in the language.

The official distribution was made "in conjunction with scholars from the University of Cambridge and elsewhere, together with the Cambridge Schools Classics Project." This distribution distinguishes U from V, with the semi-vocalic V scoring five times the points.

 2 blank tiles (scoring 0 points)
1 point: E ×11, I ×11, A ×9, R ×9, S ×8, T ×7, U ×7, N ×6
2 points: M ×5, O ×5, C ×4
3 points: D ×3
4 points: L ×2, P ×2
5 points: B ×2, V ×2
6 points: F ×1, G ×1, X ×1
10 points: H ×1, Q ×1

The second distribution, developed by the Centre for Medieval Studies of the University of Toronto, uses these 100 tiles:

 2 blank tiles (scoring 0 points)
1 point: E ×12, A ×9, I ×9, V ×9, S ×8, T ×8, R ×7, O ×5
2 points: C ×4, M ×4, N ×4, D ×3, L ×3
3 points: Q ×3
4 points: B ×2, G ×2, P ×2, X ×2
8 points: F ×1, H ×1

An extension of the second distribution for Latin Paleography, developed by the Centre for Medieval Studies of the University of Toronto, uses these 120 tiles:

 3 blank tiles (scoring 0 points)
1 point: E ×12, A ×9, I ×9, V ×9, S ×8, T ×8, R ×7, O ×5
2 points: C ×4, M ×4, N ×4, D ×3, L ×3, Ę ×2, Ē ×1, Ī ×1, œ ×1, ; ×1, ıı ×1, ııı ×1
3 points: Q ×3, & ×2, Ↄ ×1, ſt ×1, V̄ ×1
4 points: B ×2, G ×2, P ×2, X ×2
5 points: ct ×1, Ꝑ ×1, Ꝝ ×1
6 points: Ꝓ ×1, P̄ ×1
8 points: F ×1, H ×1
10 points: Y ×1

V̄ represents vm or vn (as there was no U at the time). Note that W, unlike Ę/æ and œ, which were created at the same time, has no tile because there is no vv digraph in Latin. ıı represents 2 minims: ii, v, or n. ııı represents 3 minims: iii, iv, in, vi, ni, or m.

The third distribution is as follows:

 2 blank tiles (scoring 0 points)
1 point: E ×12, I ×12, V ×10, A ×9, T ×8, S ×7, N ×6, R ×6, M ×5, O ×5, L ×3 
2 points: D ×3, P ×3
3 points: C ×4, B ×2
4 points: Q ×2, F ×1, G ×1, H ×1
8 points: X ×1
However, with this set, according to the rules, if a blank is used as a Y it is worth 10 points, if a blank is used as a Z it is worth 15 points, and if a blank is used as a K it is worth 20 points. Each of those letters are so high in points, because they are used only in borrowed words. The score of 20 for a K is the highest known point value for any letter in any Scrabble score distribution worldwide.

The fourth distribution, which uses U instead of V, and includes Y, is as follows:

 2 blank tiles (scoring 0 points)
1 point: E ×10,  A ×9, I ×9, S ×9, T ×9, U ×9
2 points: M ×6, N ×6, O ×6, R ×6
3 points: C ×4, D ×4, L ×4, P ×4
8 points: B ×2, F ×2, G ×2, H ×2, Q ×2
10 points: X ×1, Y ×1

Y is absent in all sets except the paleographic extension of the first set and the fourth set because it is rare in Latin. K and Z are absent in all sets because they are rare in Latin, while J is not considered separate from I in all sets except the third one, in which it is not included because it is rare in Latin. W is also absent in all sets because it did not exist in ancient times, and is used only in modern borrowed words.

Latvian

Latvian-language sets use these 104 tiles:

2 blank tiles (scoring 0 points)
1 point: A ×11, I ×9, S ×8, E ×6, T ×6, R ×5, U ×5
2 points: Ā ×4, K ×4, M ×4, N ×4, L ×3, P ×3
3 points: D ×3, O ×3, V ×3, Z ×2
4 points: Ē ×2, Ī ×2, J ×2
5 points: B ×1, C ×1, G ×1
6 points: Ņ ×1, Š ×1, Ū ×1
8 points: Ļ ×1, Ž ×1
10 points: Č ×1, F ×1, Ģ ×1, H ×1, Ķ ×1

Q, W, and X are absent because they are not used in modern Latvian. Y is absent because it is only used in certain dialects of Latvian. F and H are present only in loanwords, but are considered part of standard Latvian, so they are included.

Lithuanian

Lithuanian-language sets use these 104 tiles:

2 blank tiles (scoring 0 points)
1 point: I ×13, A ×12, S ×8, O ×6, T ×6, E ×5, N ×5, R ×5, K ×4, U ×4
2 points: D ×3, L ×3, M ×3, B ×1
3 points: P ×3
4 points: Ė ×2, G ×2, J ×2, V ×2
5 points: Š ×1, Y ×1
6 points: Ų ×1, Ž ×1
8 points: Ą ×1, Č ×1, Į ×1, Ū ×1
10 points: C ×1, Ę ×1, F ×1, H ×1, Z ×1

The letters Q, W and X are absent, because they are not used in Lithuanian. F and H are present only in loanwords, but are considered part of standard Lithuanian, so they are included.

The distribution for the older, unofficial, KrisKros Klasik is as follows:

2 blank tiles (scoring 0 points)
1 point: I ×11, A ×9, R ×9, E ×6, L ×6, S ×6, O ×5, T ×5, U ×5, N ×4, Ą ×1
2 points: K ×4, D ×3, M ×3, P ×3, B ×2, G ×2, Ę ×1
3 points: Ė ×2, Š ×2, Ų ×1
4 points: J ×2, Į ×1, V ×1, Ž ×1
5 points: Ū ×1, Z ×1
6 points: Y ×1
7 points: C ×1, Č ×1
10 points: F ×1, H ×1

Malagasy

Malagasy-language sets use these 102 tiles:

2 blank tiles (scoring 0 points)
1 point: A ×20, O ×14, N ×13, I ×11, T ×6, K ×5, E ×4, S ×4, Y ×4
2 points: F ×2, M ×2, V ×2
3 points: D ×2, L ×2
4 points: B ×2, P ×2
6 points: H ×1, J ×1, R ×1, Z ×1
10 points:  G ×1

C, Q, U, W, and X are absent because these letters are not used in Malagasy. Diacritical marks are ignored.

Malay

Malay-language sets use these 100 tiles:

2 blank tiles (scoring 0 points)
1 point: A ×19, N ×8, E ×7, I ×7, K ×6, U ×6, M ×5, R ×5, T ×5
2 points: L ×4, S ×4
3 points: G ×4, B ×3, D ×3
4 points: H ×2, O ×2, P ×2
5 points: J ×1, Y ×1
8 points: C ×1, W ×1
10 points: F ×1, Z ×1

Q, V and X are absent because they are only present in loanwords. So are F and Z, but these two are not so rare.

Norwegian

Norwegian-language editions of Scrabble use these 100 tiles:

2 blank tiles (scoring 0 points)
1 point: E ×9, A ×7, N ×6, R ×6, S ×6, T ×6, D ×5, I ×5, L ×5
2 points: F ×4, G ×4, K ×4, O ×4, M ×3
3 points: H ×3
4 points: B ×3, U ×3, V ×3, J ×2, P ×2, Å ×2
5 points: Ø ×2
6 points: Y ×1, Æ ×1
8 points: W ×1
10 points: C ×1

The letters Q, X and Z are absent since these letters are very rare and only occur in foreign words. These letters and the foreign letters "Ä", "Ö" and "Ü", which are used in a few Norwegian words, can be played with a blank. C and W also occur only in foreign words, but they are not so rare, so they were included.

Polish

Polish-language editions of Scrabble use these 100 tiles:

2 blank tiles (scoring 0 points)
1 point: A ×9, I ×8, E ×7, O ×6, N ×5, Z ×5, R ×4, S ×4, W ×4
2 points: Y ×4, C ×3, D ×3, K ×3, L ×3, M ×3, P ×3, T ×3
3 points: B ×2, G ×2, H ×2, J ×2, Ł ×2, U ×2
5 points: Ą ×1, Ę ×1, F ×1, Ó ×1, Ś ×1, Ż ×1
6 points: Ć ×1
7 points: Ń ×1
9 points: Ź ×1

This set has been used since 2000. Before that year, a slightly different configuration was used: Ź was worth 7 points, F was worth 4 points, and there were 2 F‍'s, and 8 A‍'s.

Literaki, a Polish online Scrabble-based game, uses the same distribution, but the maximum number of points for a tile is 5.

Alexander has released Scriba, which was  based on the Swedish game Alfapet. The distribution has 108 tiles:
 3 blank tiles (scoring 0 points), 2 black dot tiles (scoring 0 points), 3 arrow tiles (scoring 0 points)
 1 point: A ×7, E ×6, I ×6, O ×5
 2 points: T ×5, Z ×5, B ×4, N ×4, P ×4, R ×4, S ×4, Y ×4, D ×3, L ×3, M ×3, W ×3
 3 points: C ×3, F ×3, H ×3, K ×3, U ×2
 4 points: G ×3, J ×2, Ł ×2
 6 points: Ó ×2, Ą ×1, Ś ×1
 7 points: Ć ×1
 8 points: Ę ×1, Ń ×1,  Ż ×1, Ź ×1

The letters Q, V and X have always been absent (since they are used in foreign words). Blank tiles cannot be used to represent these except on the Internet Scrabble Club.

Portuguese

Portuguese-language editions of Scrabble contain 120 tiles:

3 blank tiles (scoring 0 points)
1 point: A ×14, E ×11, I ×10, O ×10, S ×8, U ×7, M ×6, R ×6, T ×5
2 points: D ×5, L ×5, C ×4, P ×4
3 points: N ×4, B ×3, Ç ×2
4 points: F ×2, G ×2, H ×2, V ×2
5 points: J ×2
6 points: Q ×1
8 points: X ×1, Z ×1

While Ç is a separate tile, other diacritical marks are ignored. K, W, and Y are absent, since they are only present in loanwords in Portuguese, and were not even official letters until 2009.

Romanian

Romanian-language editions of Scrabble use these 100 tiles:

2 blank tiles (scoring 0 points)
1 point: I ×11, A ×10, E ×9, T ×7, N ×6, R ×6, S ×6, C ×5, L ×5, U ×5
2 points: O ×5, P ×4
3 points: D ×4
4 points: M ×3, F ×2, V ×2
5 points: B ×2
6 points: G ×2
8 points: H ×1, Z ×1
10 points: J ×1, X ×1

Some amendment applied in updated version. Previously, the B was worth 8, and the O was worth 1.

The original (1982) distribution used the following 100 tiles:

2 blank tiles (scoring 0 points)
1 point: A ×11, I ×10, E ×9, R ×7, T ×7, N ×6, U ×6, C ×5, O ×5, S ×5, L ×4
2 points: D ×4, P ×4
4 points: M ×3
8 points: F ×2, V ×2
9 points: B ×2, G ×2
10 points: H ×1, J ×1, X ×1, Z ×1

Diacritical marks are ignored, so for example Ă and Â are played as A, Î is played as I.
Both distributions lack K, Q, W and Y, since they are only used in foreign words. However, you can still use a blank to represent these letters. The letter X is also used only in loanwords, but it is not so rare, so it is included.

Russian

Russian-language Scrabble sets, which use Cyrillic letters, contain 104 tiles using this distribution:

2 blank tiles (scoring 0 points)
1 point: О ×10, А ×8, Е ×8, И ×5, Н ×5, Р ×5, С ×5, Т ×5, В ×4
2 points: Д ×4, К ×4, Л ×4, П ×4, У ×4, М ×3
3 points: Б ×2, Г ×2, Ь ×2, Я ×2, Ë ×1
4 points: Ы ×2, Й ×1
5 points: З ×2, Ж ×1, Х ×1, Ц ×1, Ч ×1
8 points: Ш ×1, Э ×1, Ю ×1
10 points: Ф ×1, Щ ×1, Ъ ×1

The former Soviet distribution had 126 tiles and was as follows:

2 blank tiles (scoring 0 points)
1 point: О ×11, Е ×10, И ×10, А ×9, Н ×6, Р ×6, Т ×6, В ×5, С ×5
2 points: Д ×4, К ×4, Л ×4, М ×4, П ×4, У ×4
3 points: Я ×4,  Б ×3, Г ×3, Ë ×3,  Ь ×2
4 points: Ы ×2, Й ×2
5 points: Ж ×2, З ×2, Х ×1, Ц ×1, Ч ×1
8 points: Ш ×1, Э ×1, Ю ×1
10 points: Ф ×1, Щ ×1, Ъ ×1

In 1954, Selchow & Righter released their Foreign Language Edition of Russian with the following 124-tile distribution:

2 blank tiles (scoring 0 points)
1 point: О ×12, Е ×10, И ×10, А ×9, Н ×6, Р ×6, Т ×6, В ×5, С ×5
2 points: Д ×4, К ×4, Л ×4, М ×4, П ×4, У ×4
3 points: Я ×4,  Б ×3, Г ×3, Ь ×2
4 points: Ы ×2, Й ×2
5 points: Ж ×2, З ×2, Х ×1, Ц ×1, Ч ×1
8 points: Ш ×1, Э ×1, Ю ×1
10 points: Ф ×1, Щ ×1, Ъ ×1

This distribution has no Ë tile.

Another Russian version, called Эрудит (Erudit), has 131 tiles, and also has no Ë tile:

3 blank tiles (scoring 0 points)
1 point: А ×10, И ×8, О ×10, Е ×9, Н ×8
2 points: К ×6, П ×6, Р ×6, С ×6, В ×5, Д ×5, М ×5, Т ×5, Й ×4, Л ×4
3 points: Б ×3, Г ×3, У ×3, Я ×3
5 points: Ж ×2, З ×2, Х ×2, Ч ×2, Ы ×2, Ь ×2
10 points: Ф ×1, Ц ×1, Ш ×1,  Щ ×1, Ъ ×1, Э ×1, Ю ×1

In Erudit, only nominative singular and pluralia tantum nouns are allowed.

Slovak

Slovak-language sets use these 100 tiles:

2 blank tiles (scoring 0 points)
1 point: A ×9, O ×9, E ×8, I ×5, N ×5, R ×4, S ×4, T ×4, V ×4
2 points: M ×4, D ×3, K ×3, L ×3, P ×3
3 points: J ×2, U ×2
4 points: B ×2, Á ×1, C ×1, H ×1, Y ×1, Z ×1
5 points: Č ×1, Í ×1, Š ×1, Ý ×1, Ž ×1
7 points: É ×1, Ľ ×1, Ť ×1, Ú ×1
8 points: Ď ×1, F ×1, G ×1, Ň ×1, Ô ×1
10 points: Ä ×1, Ĺ ×1, Ó ×1, Ŕ ×1, X ×1

Q, W, Ě, Ö, Ř, and Ü are absent because they are only used in loanwords, but may be represented with a blank. The letter X is also only used in loanwords, but it is not so rare, so it is included. The digraphs CH, DZ, and DŽ, although considered single letters in the Slovak alphabet, are played as pairs of letters.

Since 2013, a new 112-tile set was introduced, including the letters Q and W:

2 blank tiles (scoring 0 points)
1 point: O ×10, A ×9, E ×8, I ×6, N ×5, S ×5, V ×5, T ×4
2 points: R ×5, K ×4, L ×4, D ×3, M ×3, P×3, U ×3, Á ×2, B ×2, J ×2, Y ×2, Z ×2
3 points: C ×1, Č ×1, É ×1, H ×1, Í ×1, Š ×1, Ú ×1, Ý ×1, Ž ×1
4 points: Ť ×1
5 points: Ľ ×1
6 points: F ×1, G ×1
7 points: Ň ×1, Ô ×1
8 points: Ä ×1, Ď ×1, Ó ×1
9 points: Ĺ ×1, Ŕ ×1, X ×1
10 points: Q ×1, W ×1

Slovenský spolok Scrabble does not recommend using this new version, because the letters and their point values do not correspond to their frequency in Slovak.

Arguably the Q and W tiles should still not be included, but the manufacturer decided to, so that loanwords can be played. In the tournament rules for accepted words, however, there are only a few words with W (not including their inflections) and almost none with Q. Some players play these two just as two more blanks, or they just remove them from the set altogether.

Slovenian

Slovenian-language sets use these 100 tiles:

2 blank tiles (scoring 0 points)
1 point: E ×11, A ×10, I ×9, O ×8, N ×7, R ×6, S ×6, J ×4, L ×4, T ×4
2 points: D ×4, V ×4
3 points: K ×3, M ×2, P ×2, U ×2
4 points: B ×2, G ×2, Z ×2
5 points: Č ×1, H ×1
6 points: Š ×1
8 points: C ×1
10 points: F ×1, Ž ×1

Q, W, X and Y are absent, because Slovenian does not use those letters.

Spanish

Spanish-language sets sold outside North America use these 100 tiles:

2 blank tiles (scoring 0 points)
1 point: A ×12, E ×12, O ×9, I ×6, S ×6, N ×5, R ×5, U ×5, L ×4, T ×4
2 points: D ×5, G ×2
3 points: C ×4, B ×2, M ×2, P ×2
4 points: H ×2, F ×1, V ×1, Y ×1
5 points: CH ×1, Q ×1
8 points: J ×1, LL ×1, Ñ ×1, RR ×1, X ×1
10 points: Z ×1

Stress accents and diaereses are disregarded. The letters K and W are absent since these two letters are only used in words of foreign origin. According to FISE (Federación Internacional de Scrabble en Español) rules, a blank cannot be used to represent K or W.

Using one C and one H tile in place of the CH tile, two L tiles for the LL tile, or two R tiles for the RR tile is also not allowed in Spanish Scrabble.

Spanish-language sets sold within North America (known as Scrabble – Edición en Español) use - including "K" and "W" but without "CH" - these 103 tiles:

 2 blank tiles (scoring 0 points)
1 point: A ×11, E ×11, O ×8, S ×7, I ×6, U ×6, N ×5, L ×4, R ×4, T ×4
2 points: C ×4, D ×4, G ×2
3 points: B ×3, M ×3, P ×2
4 points: F ×2, H ×2, V ×2, Y ×1
6 points: J ×2
8 points: K ×1, LL ×1, Ñ ×1, Q ×1, RR ×1, W ×1, X ×1
10 points: Z ×1

Stress accents are still disregarded.

Spanish-language sets sold within Latin America under the name Escarbar (a Spanish word for Scrabble) - including "K" and "CH" but without "RR" and "W" - use these 108 tiles:

 2 blank tiles (scoring 0 points)
1 point: E ×12, A ×9, I ×9, O ×8, N ×6, R ×6, T ×6, L ×4, S ×4, U ×4, Ñ ×3
2 points: D ×4, G ×3, B ×2
3 points: C ×2, M ×2, P ×2
4 points: CH ×4, LL ×3, F ×2, H ×2, V ×2, Y ×2
5 points: K ×1
8 points: J ×1, X ×1
10 points: Q ×1, Z ×1

An unofficial practice in some variants of Spanish Scrabble is the permit of words with QU to be played with the Q and with or without the following U. This variant practice eliminates the Q-without-U difficulty that may otherwise occur.

Swedish

Swedish-language Scrabble sets (until 1990 sold in Sweden as Alfapet, but that became a different game) use these 100 tiles:

2 blank tiles (scoring 0 points)
1 point: A ×8, R ×8, S ×8, T ×8, E ×7, N ×6, D ×5, I ×5, L ×5
2 points: O ×5, G ×3, K ×3, M ×3, H ×2
3 points: F ×2, V ×2, Ä ×2
4 points: U ×3, B ×2, P ×2, Ö ×2, Å ×2
7 points: J ×1, Y ×1
8 points: C ×1, X ×1
10 points: Z ×1

Å, Ä and Ö have separate tiles; other diacritics like that on É are ignored (except Ü). Q and W, found only in loanwords, are absent but can be played with a blank. Ü and Æ require a blank, and as of 2010 only occur in one and three playable words respectively: müsli and three forms of Laestadianism (læstadianism in Swedish).

Originally (starting in 1954), Swedish Scrabble sets (called Alfa-pet, made by the Swedish company Alga, since 1983 a member of the BRIO Group) used a slightly different distribution:

2 blank tiles (scoring 0 points)
1 point: T ×9, A ×8, R ×8, S ×8, E ×7, N ×6, D ×5, I ×5, L ×5
2 points: O ×5, G ×3, K ×3, M ×3, H ×2
3 points: F ×2, V ×2, Ä ×2
4 points: U ×3, B ×2, P ×2, Ö ×2, Å ×2
7 points: J ×1, Y ×1
8 points: X ×1
10 points: C ×1

Note that Z was absent in this distribution as it is almost exclusively used in loanwords. However, it could be played with a blank.

Between 1956 and 1961, the makers of Alfa-pet revised the distribution, altering the number of tiles for the letters B, E, N, O, P, S, and U. The letter C was reduced in value to 5 and the X was increased to 10:

2 blank tiles (scoring 0 points)
1 point: E ×10, N ×9, T ×9, A ×8, R ×8, S ×6, D ×5, I ×5, L ×5
2 points: O ×4, G ×3, K ×3, M ×3, H ×2
3 points: F ×2, V ×2, Ä ×2
4 points: U ×2, Ö ×2, Å ×2, B ×1, P ×1
5 points: C ×1
7 points: J ×1, Y ×1
10 points: X ×1

Circa 1961, the hyphen was dropped from the game's name, and the original Swedish distribution of the game had been restored. Sometime in the 1980s, produced under BRIO's subsidiary, Joker, the number of Ts in the set were reduced by one and an 8-point Z tile was added.

In 2002, under the ownership of Mattel and its brand name Scrabble, the Swedish language set tile values of the C and Z were changed, respectively, to 8 and 10.

Though Alga had lost its license to Mattel Europa in the early 1990s in the production of the game, the company held onto its ownership of the name Alfapet. subsequently it produced a different yet similar crossword board game. Played on a different grid layout, this game is played with a distribution which contains these 120 tiles, with Q but not W:

2 blank tiles (scoring 0 points), 2 black tiles (scoring 0 points), 2 left-pointing arrows, 2 right-pointing arrows
1 point: A ×9, R ×9, E ×8, S ×8, D ×7, L ×7, N ×7, T ×7, I ×6
2 points: O ×5, G ×4
3 points: H ×3, K ×3, M ×3, P ×3, U ×3
4 points: B ×2, F ×2, V ×2, Ä ×2, Ö ×2, Å ×2
8 points: C ×2, Y ×2, J ×1
10 points: Q ×1, X ×1, Z ×1

The black tile may be put in front of a word to create another word adjacent to the black tile and thus diagonally away from the original word. The arrows lets the player change the direction of a word anywhere between the first and last letter of the word, and are always placed under letters. Anyway, Q is only used in loanwords in modern Swedish, so it is included.

Turkish

Turkish-language sets use these 100 tiles (including distinct dotted and dotless I tiles):

2 blank tiles (scoring 0 points)
1 point: A ×12, E ×8, İ ×7, K ×7, L ×7, R ×6, N ×5, T ×5
2 points: I ×4, M ×4, O ×3, S ×3, U ×3
3 points: B ×2, D ×2, Ü ×2, Y ×2
4 points: C ×2, Ç ×2, Ş ×2, Z ×2
5 points: G ×1, H ×1, P ×1
7 points: F ×1, Ö ×1, V ×1
8 points: Ğ ×1
10 points: J ×1

Since the letters Â, Î, and Û are considered modified versions of their base forms in Turkish, they are played as A, İ, and U, respectively. The letters Q, W, and X are not used in Turkish and therefore do not appear in the set.  Blanks may not represent these letters.

(See a completed Turkish Scrabble board:)

Ukrainian

Optimum Ukrainian-language Scrabble sets, which use Cyrillic letters, contain 104 tiles using this distribution:

2 blank tiles (scoring 0 points)
1 point: О ×10, А ×8, И ×7, Н ×7, Е ×5, І ×5, Т ×5, Р ×5, В ×4
2 points:  К ×4, С ×4, М ×4, Д ×3, Л ×3, П ×3
3 points:  У ×3
4 points:  З ×2, Я ×2, Б ×2, Г ×2,
5 points:  Ч ×1, Х ×1, Й ×1, Ь ×1
6 points:  Ж ×1, Ї ×1, Ц ×1, Ш ×1
7 points:  Ю ×1
8 points:  Є ×1, Ф ×1, Щ ×1
10 points: Ґ ×1, ' ×1

The apostrophe sign is also included, even though it is not a letter in the Ukrainian alphabet.

Welsh

Welsh-language Scrabble sets use these 105 tiles:

2 blank tiles (scoring 0 points)
1 point: A ×10, E ×8, N ×8, I ×7, R ×7, Y ×7, D ×6, O ×6, W ×5, DD ×4
2 points: F ×3, G ×3, L ×3, U ×3
3 points: S ×3, B ×2, M ×2, T ×2
4 points: C ×2, FF ×2, H ×2, TH ×2
5 points: CH ×1, LL ×1, P ×1
8 points: J ×1
10 points: NG ×1, RH ×1

Since there are specific tiles for the digraphs that are considered to be separate letters in Welsh orthography (such as DD), it is not permissible to use the individual letters to spell these out. Diacritics on letters are ignored.

The digraph PH also exists in Welsh, but is omitted because it is used almost exclusively in mutated words, which the rules disallow. K, Q, V, X and Z do not exist in Welsh. J does not exist in traditional Welsh either, but it is included as it is used in some borrowed words.

Unofficial editions

Scrabble editions listed in this section are not created or licensed by Hasbro or Mattel.

Anglo-Saxon

The Anglo-Saxon editions use these 101 tiles:

2 blank tiles (scoring 0 points)
1 point:  E ×14, N ×9, A ×8, O ×6, R ×6, D ×5, S ×5, G ×4, H ×4, I ×4, L ×4
2 points: F ×3, M ×3, T ×3, W ×3
3 points: Æ ×3, C ×3, U ×3
4 points: Ð ×2, Þ ×2, Y ×2
5 points: B ×1
8 points: P ×1
10 points: X ×1

Anglo-Saxon uses the letter K, but it only occurs in one word (kyning, usually written cyning) and loanwords, so there is no tile for it. Anglo-Saxon uses the letter Z, but it is a very rare spelling of TS, and is used in loanwords for the sound of Z in modern English, so there is no tile for it. J, V, and Q are only used in loanwords. Anglo-Saxon uses the letter Ƿ, but it was replaced by W in this set because it can be easily confused with P. Anglo-Saxon also uses the letter Ȝ, but it is a typographic variant of G, so that is used instead.

Armenian

Armenian-language editions use the following 146 tiles. The board is 17x17 instead of 15x15. This version is called  (meaning words game).

3 blank tiles (scoring 0 points)
1 point: Ա ×18, Ե ×10, Ի ×10, Ո ×8, Կ ×7, Ն ×7, Ս ×6
2 points: Տ ×5, Ր ×5, Ւ ×5, Է ×4, Հ ×4, Մ ×4, Յ ×4, Պ ×4
3 points: Լ ×4, Բ ×3, Գ ×3, Դ ×3, Ք ×3, Վ ×2
4 points: Խ ×2, Շ ×2, Ռ ×2
5 points: Թ 2, Ծ ×2, Ղ ×2, Ց ×2
6 points: Զ ×1, Ճ ×1, Չ ×1, Ջ ×1
8 points: Ժ ×1, Ձ ×1, Փ ×1, Օ ×1
10 points: Ը ×1, Ֆ ×1

Notice that this distribution lacks և, another Armenian letter, because it lacks a capital letter.
However, it can be formed as a ligature of ե/Ե and ւ/Ւ.

Bambara

Bambara-language Scrabble sets use these 106 tiles:

2 blank tiles (scoring 0 points)
1 point: A ×15, E ×6, Ɛ ×6, I ×6, K ×6, L ×6, N ×6, O ×6, B ×5, M ×5
2 points: U ×5, S ×4, Y ×4, R ×3
3 points: Ɔ ×3, D ×2, T ×2
4 points: F ×2, G ×2, W ×2
8 points: J ×2, C ×1, Ɲ ×1
10 points: H ×1, Ŋ ×1, P ×1, Z ×1

The uncommon digraphic letters sh (sometimes represented with the IPA symbol ʃ; a regional variant of s) and kh (only used in loanwords) are absent as they are now considered obsolete.

 The Latin alphabetic letters Q, V, and X are also absent because these letters are not used in Bambara.

Basque

Basque-language Euskarbel sets use these 100 tiles. 
2 blank tiles (scoring 0 points)
1 point: A ×14, E ×12, I ×9, N ×8, O ×6, T ×6, U ×6
2 points: K ×5, R ×5
3 points: D ×4
4 points: B ×3, Z ×3
5 points: G ×2, H ×2, L ×2, S ×2
8 points: J ×1, M ×1, P ×1, RR ×1, TS ×1, TX ×1, TZ ×1
10 points: F ×1, X ×1

Diacritical marks are ignored. Ñ is part of the Basque language but used so infrequently that it has no tile. C, Q, V, W and Y are absent because they are only used in loanwords. Digraphs can be formed with two tiles.

Bicolano

Dama nin Tataramon, an independently produced Bicolano language variant of Scrabble, uses these 102 tiles:

2 blank tiles (scoring 0 points)
1 point: A ×16, I ×12,  N ×8, O ×8, M ×5, S ×5, T ×5, U ×5
2 points: G ×4, K ×3, R ×3
3 points: NG ×6, L ×3, P ×3
4 points: B ×3, D ×3
5 points: W ×2, Y ×2
8 points: E ×2, H ×2

The games uses the Abakada alphabet; hence the foreign letters of the present Filipino alphabet, C, F, J, Q, V, X, Z, and even Ñ, are absent. None of these letters can be played with a blank. Also, N and G being played in place of NG is not allowed.

Breton

Breton-language Scrabble sets, created in 2008 as Skrabell, use these 100 tiles:

2 - (hyphen) tiles scoring 0 points
1 point: E ×14, A ×12,  N ×9, R ×7, O ×6, T ×5, U ×5, I ×4, L ×4
2 points: D ×4
3 points: G ×3, S ×3, V ×3, H ×2
4 points: B ×2, K ×2, M ×2, Z ×2, ZH ×2, CH ×1, C'H ×1
5 points: P ×1
10 points: F ×1, J ×1, W ×1, Y ×1

C, Q, and X are absent because they are only used in loanwords or, in the case of C, the digraphs CH and C'H. However, these letters can be played with a blank. Diacritical marks are ignored.

Cornish

Cornish-language Scrabble sets use these 100 tiles.
2 blank tiles (scoring 0 points)
1 point: E ×11, A ×10,  O ×7, R ×7, S ×7, N ×6
2 points: Y ×7, L ×5, D ×4, H ×4, T ×4, C ×3, G ×3
3 points: U ×3, W ×3, I ×2
4 points: B ×2, K ×2, M ×2, P ×2
5 points: V ×2
6 points: F ×1
7 points: Q ×1

J has no tile because it is only used in a few native words (jy/je, bleujen) and in loanwords from English or French. X and Z have no tiles because these letters are only used in loanwords. This set uses the Standard Written Form with alternative spellings allowed. Apostrophes and diacritical marks are ignored. Any grammatical form may be used. This set was created by Ian Jackson in September 2018.

Dakelh

Dakelh-language Scrabble sets use these 100 tiles:

2 blank tiles (scoring 0 points)
1 point:  H ×10, U ×10, N ×8, A ×7, I ×7, L ×7, O ×7, T ×7, ʼ ×7
2 points: E ×5, S ×5
3 points: D ×4, Z ×3
4 points: K ×2
5 points: G ×2, Y ×2
7 points: W ×1
8 points: B ×1
10 points: C ×1, J ×1, M ×1

The letters F, P, R, and V, which are used only in loanwords in Dakelh and are very infrequent, are absent. The letters Q and X are also absent because these letters are not used in Dakelh.

Dakota

Dakota-language Scrabble sets use these 100 tiles:

2 blank tiles (scoring 0 points)
1 point:  A ×12, I ×10, E ×8, K ×6, Ŋ ×6, O ×6, T ×6, P ×4, U ×4
2 points: C ×3, H ×3
3 points: W ×3, Y ×3, D ×2, N ×2, S ×2
4 points: Ġ ×2, J ×2, M ×2, Ṡ ×2, Z ×2
5 points: Ḣ ×2
6 points: G ×1
8 points: B ×1, C̣ ×1, Ḳ ×1
10 points: P̣ ×1, Ṭ ×1

F, L, Q, R, V, X are absent since Dakota does not use these letters.

Esperanto

Esperanto Scrabble exists as an Internet game and as a commercially produced custom set.

Esperanto-language sets use these 100 tiles:

2 blank tiles (scoring 0 points).
1 point: A ×8, E ×8, I ×8, O ×8, N ×6, R ×6, S ×6, L ×4, T ×4, U ×4
2 points: K ×4, M ×4, D ×3, J ×3, P ×3
3 points: F ×2, G ×2, Ĝ ×2, V ×2
4 points: B ×2, Ĉ ×2, C ×1, Ŝ ×1
5 points: Z ×1
8 points: H ×1, Ŭ ×1
10 points: Ĥ ×1, Ĵ ×1

The original Esperanto set used these 120 tiles:

2 blank tiles (scoring 0 points).
1 point: A ×13, I ×11, E ×9, N ×9, O ×7, T ×6
2 points: L ×6, R ×6, S ×6, M ×5, K ×4
3 points: D ×3, J ×3, P ×3, U ×3
4 points: F ×2, G ×2, V ×2
5 points: B ×3, Ŝ ×2
6 points: Ĝ ×2, Ŭ ×1
7 points: Ĉ ×2, Z ×2
8 points: C ×2
9 points: H ×1
10 points: Ĵ ×2, Ĥ ×1

Q, W, X, and Y are not present in either set, since Esperanto does not use those letters.

Galician

Galician-language sets use these 100 tiles:

1 point: A ×12, E ×10, O ×9, R ×8, S ×7, I ×6, L ×6, N ×6, C ×5, T ×4
2 points: D ×3, U ×3
3 points: M ×4, B ×2, P ×2
4 points: G ×2, V ×1
5 points: F ×1, H ×1, X ×1
6 points: Z ×1 
7 points: Ñ ×1, Q ×1
8 points: K ×1
9 points: W ×1, Y ×1
10 points: J ×1

Stress accents and diaereses are disregarded. This is called Letrad@s.GZ (originally Scrabble.GZ). J, K, W, and Y are officially non-existent in Galician, but they are included here as they are sometimes used in borrowed words. Blanks do not exist in this game.

Gwichʼin

Gwichʼin-language editions of Scrabble contain 200 letter tiles, in the following distribution:

4 blank tiles (scoring 0 points)
1 point: ʼ ×19, I ×17, A  ×12, N ×9, T ×8, H ×7, Ą ×5, E ×2, Ę ×1, Į ×1, O ×1, Ǫ ×1, U ×1, Ų ×1
2 points: AA ×8, CH ×7, EE ×7, ĄĄ ×4, II ×4, ĘĘ ×1, ĮĮ ×1, OO ×1, ǪǪ ×1, TH ×1, UU ×1, ŲŲ ×1
3 points: AII ×4, AĮĮ ×4, D ×4, G ×4, K ×4, R ×4, Y ×4, S ×1, TTH ×1,  W ×1
4 points: TS ×6, L ×2, Ł ×2,  TR ×2, DH ×1, GH ×1, KH ×1, SH ×1
5 points: J ×2, TŁ ×2, V ×2, Z ×1
6 points: GW ×4, ZH ×4, DR ×1, KW ×1
7 points: DL ×2, DDH ×1, KHW ×1, SHR ×1
8 points: DZ ×1
9 points: ZHR ×1
10 points: B ×1, F ×1, M ×1
Grave accents are ignored. Digraphs and trigraphs can be played with multiple tiles. GHW, ND, NH, NJ, and RH are not included, as these digraphs and trigraphs are very rare in Gwichʼin. C, P, Q, and X are also absent because these letters are not used in Gwichʼin, or, in the case of C, outside the digraph CH. Arguably B, F, and M are not used in Gwichʼin either, but they are included as these letters are used for borrowed words.

Haitian Creole

Haitian Creole-language editions of Scrabble contain these 100 tiles:

2 blank tiles (scoring 0 points)
1 point: A ×9, N ×9, E ×8, I ×6
2 points: È ×4, K ×4, L ×4, M ×4, O ×4, OU ×4, P ×4, S ×4, T ×4, Y ×4
3 points: D ×3
4 points: B ×3, CH ×2, F ×2, G ×2, J ×2, Ò ×2, R ×2, V ×2, W ×2
7 points: Z ×1
8 points: À ×1, UI ×1
10 points: H ×1

X has no tile as it is only used in loanwords in Haitian Creole. C, Q and U are absent, since they are not used in Haitian Creole, or, in the case of C, outside the digraph CH, and U outside the digraphs OU and UI.

Hausa

Hausa-language Scrabble sets use these 114 tiles:

2 blank tiles (scoring 0 points)
1 point: A ×14, I ×9, N ×8, D ×6, K ×6, S ×6, U ×6, Y ×6
2 points: M ×5
3 points: B ×4, E ×4, H ×4, R ×4, T ×4, W ×4
4 points: G ×3, L ×3, O ×3
5 points: C ×2, F ×2, J ×2
7 points: Ɗ ×1, Ƙ ×1, Z ×1
8 points: Ɓ ×1
9 points: TS ×1, ‍'‍×1
10 points: ‍'Y‍×1

This version is made for Hausa in Nigeria. In Niger, a Ƴ tile would be used instead of a ‍'Y‍ tile. P has no tile, as it is only used in loanwords in Hausa and is very infrequent. SH has no tile because it is not a letter in all Hausa alphabets. R̃, which was created to distinguish the two R phonemes, has no tile as the phonemes are not always distinguished by Hausa speakers. Q, V, and X have no tiles because these letters are not used at all in Hausa.

Hawaiian

There is no official Hawaiian-language edition of Scrabble, but one suggested version contains these 100 tiles:

5 blank tiles (scoring 0 points)
1 point: A ×21 
2 points: K ×20, O ×11
3 points: I ×8, N ×8
4 points: E ×6
5 points: U ×5
6 points: H ×5
7 points: L ×4
8 points: M ×3, P ×3
9 points: W ×1

B, C, D, F, G, J, Q, R, S, T, V, X, Y, and Z have no tiles as they are not used in Hawaiian. For the sake of the geocache this is connected to, the distribution had to be modified a bit. For example, there should be 28 A's, 7 E's, 11 K's, and 6 U's. The diacritical marks and the okina ' are ignored.

Igbo

Igbo-language sets use these 134 tiles, and a 19×19-tile board:

 4 blank tiles (scoring 0 points)
1 point: A ×8, E ×8, I ×8, Ị ×8, O ×8, Ọ ×8, U ×8, Ụ ×8
2 points: D ×6, R ×6, T ×6
3 points: B ×5, M ×5
4 points: F ×4, N ×4, K ×3, S ×3
5 points: G ×4, H ×3, L ×3
6 points: W ×4, P ×3
7 points: Y ×2
10 points: C ×1, J ×1, Ñ ×1, V ×1,  Z ×1

While C is only used in the digraph CH, the C was likely included because the CH is played with a C and an H. It is unknown if a blank can be used to represent CH. Q and X are not included as these letters are not used in Igbo.

IPA English

IPA sets use these 106 tiles:

2 blank tiles (scoring 0 points)
1 point: ə ×7, n ×7, ɪ ×6, l ×6, s ×6, t ×6, k ×5,  ɹ ×5, d ×4, i ×4, m ×4, ɛ ×3, z ×3
2 points: ɑ ×3, æ ×3, b ×2, oʊ ×2, p ×2
3 points: aɪ ×2,eɪ ×2, f ×2, ɡ ×2, ɔ ×2, v ×2
4 points: h ×1, ŋ ×1, ʃ ×1, u ×1, w ×1
5 points: dʒ ×1, j ×1, tʃ ×1
8 points: aʊ ×1, ɔɪ ×1, θ ×1, ʊ ×1
10 points: ð ×1, ʒ ×1
ɒ and a are not included as they are allophones of ɑ in varieties of English that have the father–bother merger, including most of the United States. e is an allophone of eɪ. ɫ is an allophone of l. ɱ is an allophone of m.   o is an allophone of oʊ. ɾ and r are allophones of ɹ. ʌ is an allophone of ə. ʍ is an allophone of w. ʔ is not considered a phoneme in English. The affricates ts and dz do not have their own tiles, and so must be formed with two. But for a few exceptional cases, the sounds ɐ, β, ʙ, ɓ, c, cʼ, ɕ, ç, ɗ, ɖ, ɘ, ɣ, ɤ, ɠ, ɢ, ʛ, ħ, ʜ, ɦ, ɥ, ɧ, ɨ, ɟ, ʄ, ʝ, kʼ, ɭ, ɬ, ɮ, ʟ, ɯ, ɰ, ɲ, ɳ, ɴ, ø, ɵ, œ, ɶ, pʼ, q, qʼ, ɻ, ɽ, ɺ, ʀ, ʁ, ʂ, tʼ, ʈ, ʉ, ʋ, ⱱ, x, χ, y, ʏ, ʎ, ʐ, ʑ, ʡ, ʕ, and ʢ, ǀ, ǁ, ǃ, ʘ, and ǂ are not used in American English. An extended version has 1 ʙ worth 14, 1 ʛ worth 12, 1 ħ worth 9, 1 kʼ worth 11, 1 ɮ worth 11, 1 ɲ worth 13, 1 ʉ worth 11, 1 ⱱ worth 11, 1 ǃ worth 16, and 1 ʘ worth 18.

An alternative by Scrabble3D has this distribution (no combinations): 
1 point: ɪ ×8, ə ×7, t ×6, n ×5, s ×5, d ×4, k ×4, ɫ ×4, r ×4, ɛ ×3, ɝ ×3, i ×3, m ×3, p ×3, z ×3, æ ×2
2 points: b ×2, e ×2, ʊ ×2
3 points: a ×2, ɑ ×2, f ×2, ɡ ×2, ŋ ×2, ɔ ×2, o ×2, ʃ ×2, v ×2
4 points: u ×1, w ×1, ʒ ×1
5 points: h ×1, j ×1
8 points: θ ×1
10 points: ð ×1

Japanese Hiragana 

The Japanese Hiragana Scrabble set uses these 100 tiles:
2 blank tiles (scoring 0 points)
1 point: い (I) x4, う (U) x4, か (KA) x4, し (SHI) x4, た (TA) x4, て (TE) x4, と (TO) x4, の (NO) x4, ん (N/N') x4
2 points: き (KI) x3, く (KU) x3, こ (KO) x3, つ (TSU) x3, な (NA) x3, に (NI) x3, は (HA) x3, よ (YO) x3, れ (RE) ×3
3 points: あ (A) x2, け (KE) x2, す (SU) x2, せ (SE) x2, も (MO) x2, り (RI) x2, る (RU) x2, わ (WA) x2, ら (RA) ×1
4 points: さ (SA) x1, そ (SO) x1, ち (CHI) x1, ま (MA) ×1
5 points: お (O) x1, ひ (HI) x1, ふ (FU) x1, ゆ (YU) ×1
6 points: ほ (HO) x1, め (ME) x1, や (YA) ×1
8 points: え (E) x1, へ (HE) x1, み (MI) ×1
10 points: ね (NE) x1, む (MU) x1, ろ (RO) ×1
12 points: ぬ (NU) ×1

In this version, words are played as collated in the dictionary:
 Modified letters with the diacritics ゛ and ゜ , as well as the small letters are played using the unmodified letter: e.g.  (disuko "disco") is played with the tiles  (te i su ko).
 In addition, lengtheners are played by doubling the previous tile's vowel: e.g.  (rāmen ramen noodles) is played with the tiles  (ra a me n).
 These modifications are applied per word; that is, theoretically, the same tile  can validly stand for  horizontally, and っ vertically:
{| class="wikitable" lang="ja"
|-
| || || || あ || ||
|-
| こ || と || は || つ || か || い
|-
| || || || か || ||
|}
The player is allowed to extend vertically into  ( atsukau).

This version was created by a student from Japan, and is not in wide circulation.

A larger, more popular set by Scrabble3D uses these 214 tiles:
2 blank tiles (scoring 0 points)
1 point: う (U) ×10, ん (N) ×9, い (I) ×8
2 points: し (SHI) ×6, く (KU) ×5, き (KI) ×5, か (KA) ×5, ょ (Small YO) ×5, り (RI) ×5, る (RU) ×5
3 points: じ (JI) ×4, こ (KO) ×4, つ (TSU) ×4, ゅ (Small YU) ×4, ち (CHI) ×4, せ (SE) ×4, た (TA) ×4, け (KE) ×3, と (TO) ×3, す (SU) ×3, さ (SA) ×3, て (TE) ×3, が (GA) ×3, っ (Small TSU) ×3
4 points: ま (MA) ×3, な (NA) ×3, お (O) ×3, み (MI) ×3, あ (A) ×3, え (E) ×3, に (NI) ×3, ら (RA) ×3, は (HA) ×3, れ (RE) ×3, の (NO) ×3, そ (SO) ×3, め (ME) ×3, ひ (HI) ×3, ど (DO) ×3, ゃ (Small YA) ×3
5 points: も (MO) ×2, だ (DA) ×2, わ (WA) ×2, ふ (FU) ×2, げ (GE) ×2, ぶ (BU) ×2, よ (YO) ×2, ぎ (GI) ×2, ば (BA) ×2, や (YA) ×2, ほ (HO) ×2, ご (GO) ×2, ろ (RO) ×2, む (MU) ×2, び (BI) ×2, ぼ (BO) ×2, ね (NE) ×2
6 points: で (DE) ×2, ぐ (GU) ×2, ぜ (ZE) ×2, ゆ (YU) ×2, ざ (ZA) ×2, ず (ZU) ×2
8 points: へ (HE) ×1, べ (BE) ×1, ぞ (ZO) ×1
10 points: を (WO) ×1, ぱ (PA) ×1
15 points: づ (DZU) ×1, ぬ (NU) ×1, ぽ (PO) ×1, ぷ (PU) ×1, ぴ (PI) ×1, ぺ (PE) ×1, ぢ (DJI) ×1

In this version, words are played as they are written in all-kana text, and 9 tiles are played at a time. That is, in the 214-tile variant, the word ヨーロッパ (yōroppa "Europe") is played with the tiles よ, blank, ろ, っ, and ぱ (there is no tile for ー), while in the 100-tile variant, it is played as よ, お, ろ, つ, and は.

The obsolete letters ゐ and ゑ, letters only used in loanwords ぇ, ゎ, ぃ, ぁ, ぅ, and ぉ, along with the lengthener ー,  have no tiles (with the first three letters and the lengthener being playable with a blank). Blank tiles may be played as standalone diacritics ゛ and ゜.

Japanese Romaji 

Japanese Romaji Scrabble sets use these 102 tiles:
2 blank tiles (scoring 0 points)
1 point: A ×12, U ×12, I ×11, O ×10, N ×7
2 points: K ×6, S ×6, E ×5, H ×4, R ×4, T ×4
3 points: M ×3,  - ×2
4 points: G ×2, Y ×2
5 points: B ×2, D ×2
6 points: J ×1, Z ×1
8 points: F ×1, P ×1, W ×1
10 points: C ×1

L, Q and X are absent as they do not exist in Japanese. V, which exists only in loanwords, is absent because of its rare frequency. It  can be used for a blank with 20 points reward for each play. - represents long vowel. Romaji scrabble games consist of all 3 scripts used in Japanese language - Hiragana, Katakana and Kanji in romanized form.

2 blank tiles (scoring 0 points)
1 point: U ×13, A ×12, I ×12, O ×10, N ×7
2 points: K ×6, S ×6, E ×5, R ×4, T ×4
3 points: H ×4, M ×3
4 points: G ×2, Y ×2
5 points: B ×2, D ×2
6 points: J ×1, Z ×1
8 points: F ×1, P ×1, W ×1
10 points: C ×1

This version does not use the long vowel "-". For instance, 東京(Tokyo) is played as "toukyou", 優秀(excellent) is played as "yuushuu" and ユース(youth) is played as "yuusu".

Scrabble3D has a different distribution, released earlier:
2 blank tiles (scoring 0 points)
1 point: O ×12, U ×12, A ×11, I ×11, N ×10, E ×5
2 points: H ×5, K ×5, S ×5, T ×5
3 points: R ×3, Y ×2
4 points: B ×2, G ×2
5 points: M ×2, P ×2
6 points: J ×1, Z ×1
8 points: D ×1, W ×1, (- ×1)
10 points: C ×1, F ×1

The - for long vowels is optional (not in the standard set). V has no tile, but can be played with a blank.

One board game (Romeo) has a different distribution, released earlier:
2 blank tiles (scoring 0 points)
1 point: A ×12,  N ×12, I ×10, O ×10, U ×7, E ×6
2 points: K ×5, S ×5, T ×5
3 points: H ×3, R ×3
4 points: B ×2, G ×2, M ×2, Y ×2, Z ×2
5 points: CH ×1, D ×1, J ×1
8 points: F ×1, W ×1
10 points: P ×1

In this version, note that C has no tile as it is used exclusively in the digraph CH.

Klingon

Klingon-language sets use these 100 tiles:

2 blank tiles (scoring 0 points)
1 point: ʼ ×10, a ×10, e ×8, ɪ ×8, o ×6, u ×6, H ×5
2 points: j ×5, m ×5, D ×4, v ×4
3 points: l ×3, b ×2, ch ×2, gh ×2, n ×2, q ×2, S ×2
4 points: p ×2, t ×2
5 points: w ×2, y ×2  
6 points: Q ×1, r ×1
8 points: tlh ×1
10 points: ng ×1

The letter tiles may show Klingon symbols (pIqaD), their renderings in the English alphabet, or both.

An older Klingon distribution by a different manufacturer (which is also not official) uses these 102 tiles (the first game was missing the blanks):

2 blank tiles (scoring 0 points)
1 point: a ×11, e ×8, ɪ ×8, o ×8, ʼ ×6, H ×6, u ×6, m ×3, v ×3
2 points: l ×4, D ×3, gh ×3, j ×3, S ×3, r ×2
3 points: b ×5, t ×3, q ×2
4 points: ch ×2, n ×2, p ×2, w ×2, y ×2
8 points: Q ×1
10 points: ng ×1, tlh ×1

These versions are separate from Hasbro's own licensed "Star Trek Scrabble" game, in which players can receive bonus points by playing Klingon words using standard English-language tiles.

L33t

Marketed as L33t Tiles by the now defunct Wiremelon, LLC, editions of an English-L33tspeak variant of Scrabble contain 103 letter tiles in the following distribution:

2 asterisk [*] tiles (scoring 0 points)
1 point: E ×6, N ×6, R ×6, A ×4, I ×4, L ×4, O ×4, U ×4, T ×3, S ×2
2 points: 3 ×6, 1 ×5, 4 ×5, D ×4, 0 ×4, G ×3, Z ×3, 7 ×3
3 points: X ×4, B ×2, C ×2, M ×2, P ×2
4 points: F ×2, H ×2, V ×2, W ×2, Y ×2
5 points: K ×1
6 points: J ×1
10 points: Q ×1

Lojban

Lojban-language sets use these 160 tiles:

3 blank tiles (scoring 0 points)
1 point: I ×4, R ×4, L ×3, N ×3, U ×3, A ×2, C ×2, E ×2, M ×2, S ×2, T ×2, A ×2, E ×2, I ×2
2 points: B ×2, D ×2, G ×2, J ×2, K ×2,  P ×2, O ×2, U ×2, O ×1, Y ×1, CI ×1, KA ×1, LA ×1, LI ×1, MA ×1, NA ×1, RA ×1, RI ×1, SE ×1
3 points: F ×1, V ×1, X ×1, Z ×1, BA ×1, CA ×1, DA ×1, GA ×1, JI ×1, KU ×1, MI ×1, NI ×1, NU ×1, PA ×1, RE ×1, RU ×1, SA ×1, SI ×1, TA ×1, TE ×1, TI ×1, XA ×1
4 points: BI ×1, CE ×1, CU ×1, DE ×1, DI ×1, DU ×1, FA ×1, GU ×1, JA ×1, JU ×1, KE ×1, KI ×1, LE ×1, LU ×1, MU ×1, NE ×1, NO ×1, PE ×1, PI ×1, RO ×1, SU ×1, TO ×1, TU ×1, VA ×1, VI ×1
5 points: BE ×1, BO ×1, BU ×1, CY ×1, DY ×1, FE ×1, FI ×1, FU ×1, GE ×1, GI ×1, JE ×1, JY ×1, KO ×1, KY ×1, LO ×1, ME ×1, MO ×1, NY ×1, PO ×1, PU ×1, RY ×1, SO ×1, SY ×1, TY ×1, VE ×1, XE ×1, ZA ×1, ZU ×1, ZY ×1
6 points: BY ×1, CO ×1, DO ×1, FO ×1, FY ×1, GY ×1, LY ×1, MY ×1, PY ×1, VO ×1, VY ×1, XI ×1, XU ×1
7 points: JO ×1, ZE ×1
8 points: XY ×1, ZI ×1
10 points: GO ×1, VU ×1

The combination XO is absent as it is only used in 7 words (and ). The combination ZO is absent as it is only used in 7 words (and ). The combination Y is absent as it is only used in 1 word. The letter . occurs in Lojban, but it is so infrequent that it has no tile. Blanks can be used to represent any of the above letters (including .) and digrams (including XO, ZO, and Y). The letter  occurs in Lojban, but only in digrams and never as one letter. The letters H, Q, and W  are absent, because these letters are not used in Lojban.

Lojban-language sets in the 1990s (which include lujvo) use these 100 tiles:

2 blank tiles (scoring 0 points)
1 point: A ×10, I ×10, Y ×8, N ×7, R ×7, U ×6, E ×5
2 points: L ×4, O ×4, S ×4, T ×4,  ×4
3 points: C ×3, J ×3, K ×3, M ×3
4 points: B ×2, D ×2, F ×2, G ×2, P ×2
6 points: V ×1, X ×1
9 points: Z ×1

Lojban-language sets in the 1990s (which do not include lujvo) use these 100 tiles:

2 blank tiles (scoring 0 points)
1 point: A ×12, I ×12, U ×8, N ×7, E ×6, R ×5,  ×4
2 points: O ×5, C ×4, L ×4, S ×4, T ×4
3 points: D ×3, J ×3, K ×3, M ×3
5 points: B ×2, F ×2, G ×2, P ×2
8 points: V ×1
9 points: X ×1
10 points: Z ×1
Y is absent because it is very rare outside lujvo.

Māori

Māori-language sets (known as Scramble) use these 225 tiles:

3 blank tiles (scoring 0 points)
1 point: A ×25, I ×25, O ×25, U ×20
2 points: E ×15, R ×15, T ×15, K ×12, N ×12, W ×12
3 points: H ×10, M ×10, P ×10
4 points: NG ×10
5 points: WH ×6

Diacritical marks are ignored. B, C, D, F, G, J, L, Q, S, V, X, Y, and Z are absent because these letters are not used in Māori, or, for G, outside the NG digraph. 

Another version, called Kuputupu, uses these 102 tiles:

2 blank tiles (scoring 0 points)
1 point: A ×13, E ×10, I ×10, U ×10, O ×9
2 points: R ×7, T ×7, K ×5
3 points: N ×7, H ×5
4 points: P ×5
5 points: M ×5, W ×4
10 points: G ×3

Math

Math sets use these 100 tiles:

2 blank tiles (scoring 0 points)
1 point: = ×18, 1 ×8, 2 ×7
2 points: 0 ×6, 3 ×6, 4 ×6
3 points: 5 ×6, 6 ×6, 8 ×5, + ×3, − ×3
4 points: 7 ×5, 9 ×5, × ×3, ÷ ×3
5 points: √ ×2
6 points: ² ×1
7 points: ³ ×1
8 points: ! ×1
9 points: ^ ×1
10 points: . ×1, ∜ ×1
To play, you have to put in a true equation on the board.

Math sets previously used these 120 tiles:

3 blank tiles (scoring 0 points)
0 points: = ×18
1 point: 1 ×10
2 points: 2 ×8, 4 ×7, 5 ×7
3 points: 0 ×6
4 points: 3 ×7, 6 ×7, 8 ×6, 9 ×6
5 points: 7 ×6
6 points: + ×4, − ×4, × ×4
7 points: ÷ ×3, √ ×3
8 points: . ×3
9 points: ^ ×1
10 points: ! ×1, ² ×1, ³ ×1, ∜ ×1, ∞ ×1, < ×1, > ×1

Na'vi

Na'vi language sets use these 100 tiles:

2 blank tiles (scoring 0 points)
1 point:  A ×12, E ×8, L ×6, N ×6, T ×6, Y ×6, O ×5, U ×5, I ×4, R ×4
2 points: Ì ×4, ʼ ×4, Ä ×3, S ×3
3 points: K ×3, M ×3, P ×3
4 points: F ×2, G ×2, V ×2, W ×2
5 points: H ×1
8 points: X ×3
10 points: Z ×1

Note that B, D, J, Q, and C (which is a rare alternative spelling of the digraph TS) have no tiles because these letters are not used in Na'vi. Note that G is only used in the NG digraph (and is also a rare alternative spelling of that digraph), and X is only used in the KX, PX, and TX digraphs. You cannot use a blank to represent the digraphs KX, LL, NG, PX, RR, TS, TX, or the diphthongs AW, AY, EW, or EY (which are sometimes considered as digraphs). This set was created by LearnNa'vi.org. Shortly after, the idea of revising the set to have the digraphs as single tiles (removing the G and X tiles) was proposed, but that has not taken effect so far.

Nuxalk

	
The Nuxalk-language edition uses these 212 tiles:	
1 point: A ×25, S ×20, T ×12, I ×10, K ×10, LH ×9, M ×9, TS ×8, U ×8
2 points: L ×7, N ×7, Q ×6, Qʼ ×6, Y ×6, TLʼ ×5, X ×5
3 points: AA ×4, C ×4, CW ×4, Kʼ ×4, KW ×4, P ×4, Tʼ ×4, TSʼ ×4, XW ×4
4 points: KWʼ ×4, W ×4, QW ×3, UU ×2
5 points: QWʼ ×3, II ×2
7 points: Pʼ ×2
9 points: H ×2
11 points: 7 ×2

The letters B, D, E, F, G, J, O, R, V and Z are not used in Nuxalk and therefore have no tiles. The 7 is included in the set because it is an actual letter in Nuxalk. It is used to replace ' if you don't have a tile ending with '. Arguably H and 7 do not exist in Nuxalk, but they are included as they are used for borrowed words, or in the case of 7, optionally at the beginning of a word.

Occitan

The Occitan-language edition, called "E-scrabbl'òc", uses these 102 tiles:

2 blank tiles (scoring 0 points)
1 point: A ×15, E ×10, R ×8, S ×8, I ×7, N ×7, T ×7, O ×6
2 points: L ×4, M ×4, U ×4, C ×3
4 points: G ×3, B ×2, D ×2, P ×2
6 points: V ×2, F ×1, H ×1
10 points: J ×1, Q ×1, X ×1, Z ×1

K, W, and Y are absent because they are only used in loanwords. It is unknown if blanks can be used to represent K, W, or Y.

Persian

Persian-language editions, which use Arabic letters, use the following 102 tiles:

2 blank tiles (scoring 0 points)
1 point: ﺍ‎ ×9, ی‎ ×8, ﺭ‎ ×7, ﻡ‎ ×7, ﺕ‎ ×6, ﻥ‎ ×6, ﺩ‎ ×4, ﺵ‎ ×4, ﻝ‎ ×4, ﻭ‎ ×4, ﻩ‎ ×4, ﺏ‎ ×3, ﺱ‎ ×3, ک‎ ×3
2 points: ﺯ‎ ×2,  ﻑ‎ ×2
3 points: ﺝ‎ ×2, ﺥ‎ ×2, ﻕ‎ ×2
4 points: پ‎ ×2, ﺡ‎ ×2, ﻉ‎ ×2, گ‎ ×2
6 points: آ‎ ×1, چ‎ ×1, ﺹ‎ ×1, ﻁ‎ ×1, ﻍ‎ ×1
8 points: ﺫ‎ ×1, ژ‎ ×1, ﺽ‎ ×1
10 points: ﺙ‎ ×1, ﻅ‎ ×1

Although Persian letters have up to four forms, Scrabble tiles use the isolated form. The pattern of using the isolated forms in composing words is also found in the Arabic Scrabble set and in Arabic crosswords and is one of the rare situations when Arabic letters are not connected to each other. This set was created by Scrabble3D.

Pinyin

In the word game PinyinPal, a Pinyin version, these 100 tiles are used:

2 blank tiles (scoring 0 points)
1 point: A ×13, I ×13, N ×13, U ×8, G ×7, H ×7, O ×6
2 points: E ×5, Y ×3, Z ×3
3 points: C ×2, D ×2, J ×2, L ×2, S ×2, X ×2
4 points: B ×1, F ×1, M ×1, P ×1, Q ×1, T ×1
5 points: W ×1
8 points: K ×1, R ×1
10 points: V ×1

The V is used to represent Ü. Diacritical marks are ignored. The digraphic letters ZH, CH and SH have no tiles. Instead, they are played putting a Z, C or S tile in front of an H tile.

Scottish Gaelic

Scottish Gaelic-language sets originally were planned to use these 104 tiles:

2 blank tiles (scoring 0 points)
1 point: A ×14, E ×9, I ×9, N ×4, O ×4, R ×4, S ×4
2 points: CH ×4, D ×4, DH ×4, L ×4, U ×3, BH ×2
3 points: C ×3, G ×3, T ×3, TH ×3, B ×2, M ×2
4 points: NN ×2
5 points: À ×2, GH ×2, F ×1, FH ×1, MH ×1
6 points: È ×1, Ì ×1, Ò ×1, P ×1, Ù ×1
8 points: LL ×1, RR ×1
10 points: NG ×1

The distribution was modified a bit (Dropping NG due to its rarity, adding more A, E, and I tiles, and changing the number of tiles to 100).

Scottish Gaelic-language sets use these 100 tiles:

2 blank tiles (scoring 0 points)
1 point: A ×15, I ×11, E ×10, N ×4, O ×4, R ×4, S ×4, PH ×1, SH ×1
2 points: CH ×3, D ×3, DH ×3, L ×3, U ×2, BH ×1
3 points: C ×3, G ×3, T ×3, TH ×3, B ×2, M ×2
4 points: NN ×1
5 points: À ×1, F ×1, FH ×1, GH ×1, MH ×1
6 points: È ×1, Ì ×1, Ò ×1, P ×1, Ù ×1
8 points: LL ×1, RR ×1

H is absent because it is only used in lenited consonants. Á, É, and Ó are absent since they are rarely used in the Scottish Gaelic language. J, K, Q, V, W, X, Y, and Z are absent since they are not used in the Scottish Gaelic language. This version is used by Scrabble3D.

Cyrillic Serbian

Serbian-language sets use these 102 tiles:
2 blank tiles (scoring 0 points)
1 point: А ×11, И ×9, Е ×8, О ×8, Н ×6, Р ×6, С ×5, Т ×5, У ×4, Д ×3
2 points: В ×4, К ×4, М ×4, Л ×3, П ×3
3 points: З ×2, Ј ×2
4 points: Б ×2, Г ×2
5 points: Њ ×1, Ц ×1, Ч ×1, Ш ×1 
7 points: Ћ ×1, Х ×1,
8 points: Ж ×1, Љ ×1
10 points: Ђ ×1, Ф ×1, Џ ×1

Tagalog

Salitaan, an independently produced Tagalog language variant of Scrabble, uses these 155 tiles:

3 blank tiles (scoring 0 points)
1 point: A ×27, I ×17, N ×13, U ×9, L ×8, T ×8, M ×7, S ×7
2 points: K ×6, O ×6
3 points: P ×5
4 points: G ×7, B ×5
5 points: NG ×5, H ×4, R ×3
8 points: D ×3, E ×3, Y ×3
10 points: W ×1

The games uses the Abakada alphabet; hence the foreign letters of the present Filipino alphabet, C, F, J, Q, V, X, Z, and even Ñ, are absent. None of these letters can be played with a blank. N and G being played in place of NG is allowed.

Tamil
There are two Tamil language sets: an easy version, which plays some combining vowel signs separately, and a difficult version, which plays all letters with vowel signs as individual tiles.
The set for the easy version uses these 1000 tiles:

1 point: ா ×85, க ×57, த ×48, ம் ×41, ப ×36, ை ×35, வ ×31, ச ×29, ர ×28, ல் ×26, ம ×25, ெ ×24, ே ×22, ட ×18, ய ×18, ல ×17, ன் ×17, தி ×17, கு ×15, டு ×15, ன ×12, ரு ×11, து ×10
2 points: த் ×23, க் ×22, ட் ×15, ப் ×15, ர் ×13, அ ×10, டி ×10, வி ×10, பு ×10, ந ×9, சி ×9, ள ×8, ரி ×8, ற ×7, கி ×7, பி ×7, று ×7, ள் ×6
3 points: ண் ×9, ங் ×8, ந் ×8, ற் ×7, மு ×6, இ ×4, உ ×4, யி ×3, ளி ×3
4 points: ண ×7, ச் ×7, ஆ ×3, மி ×3, றி ×3, வு ×3, எ ×2
5 points: சு ×7, ய் ×5, லி ×4, ழ ×3, நி ×3, னி ×3, ஒ ×1, ழ் ×1
6 points: ணி ×3, ழி ×2, லு ×2, ழு ×2, யு ×1, ளு ×1
7 points: கூ ×2, ஏ ×1, னு ×1
8 points: ஞ் ×4, பூ ×3, மூ ×2, ஐ ×1, வ் ×1, நீ ×1, மீ ×1, வீ ×1, நூ ×1
9 points: ஈ ×1, ஊ ×1, ஓ ×1, கீ ×1, சீ ×1, தீ ×1, பீ ×1, ணு ×1, சூ ×1, தூ ×1, யூ ×1
10 points: ஃ ×1, ஞ ×1, டீ ×1, ணீ ×1, யீ ×1, ரீ ×1, லீ ×1, ளீ ×1, றீ ×1, னீ ×1, நு ×1, டூ ×1, ணூ ×1, ரூ ×1, லூ ×1, வூ ×1, ளூ ×1, றூ ×1, னூ ×1

The set for the difficult version uses these 1000 tiles:
1 point: ம் ×49, த ×42, க ×40, ல் ×32, ப ×23, ர ×23, ன் ×20, வ ×20, தி ×20, ச ×19, டு ×18, ம ×17, கு ×17, ர் ×16, ய ×14, கா ×13, ரு ×13, ட ×12, து ×12
2 points: த் ×27, க் ×26, ட் ×18, ப் ×18, டி ×12, வி ×12, பு ×12, அ ×11, ல ×10, சி ×10, ரி ×10, ன ×9, பா ×9, பி ×9, வா ×8, கி ×8, று ×7, ள் ×7
3 points: ங் ×10, ண் ×10, ச் ×9, ந் ×9, ற் ×8, சு ×8, தா ×7, மு ×7, சா ×6, மா ×6, டை ×6, லை ×6, இ ×5, உ ×5, ள ×5, கை ×5, கொ ×5
4 points: ண ×6, ய் ×5, ரா ×5, லி ×5, ந ×4, ற ×4, நா ×4, யா ×4, ளி ×4, ஆ ×3, மி ×3, றி ×3, வு ×3, செ ×3, வெ ×3, எ ×2
5 points: ணி ×4, நி ×3, யி ×3, ழி ×3, னி ×3, ழு ×3, ரை ×3, கோ ×3, போ ×3,டா ×2, லா ×2, வே ×2, வை ×2, ளை ×2, பொ ×2
6 points: ஞ் ×4, பூ ×3, ழ ×2, லு ×2, கூ ×2, பெ  ×2, தே ×2, சை ×2, தை ×2, மை ×2, றை ×2, னை ×2, ஒ ×1, ழ் ×1, ளு ×1
7 points: ஏ ×1, னா ×1, சீ ×1, யு ×1, மூ ×1, தெ ×1, நெ ×1, சே ×1, பே ×1, மே ×1, ணை ×1, சொ ×1, தொ ×1, சோ ×1, தோ ×1
8 points: ஊ ×1, ணா ×1, தீ ×1, நீ ×1, மீ ×1, வீ ×1, னு ×1, தூ ×1, கெ ×1, மெ ×1, கே ×1, பை ×1, ழை ×1, மொ ×1, மோ ×1
9 points: ஈ ×1, ஓ ×1, வ் ×1, ஞா ×1, ளா×1, கீ ×1, பீ ×1, ணு ×1, சூ ×1, நூ ×1, நே ×1, நோ ×1, யோ ×1, ரோ ×1
10 points: ஐ ×1, ழா ×1, றா ×1, ரீ ×1, நு ×1, யூ ×1, ரூ ×1, யெ ×1, யே ×1, ரே ×1, லே ×1, யை ×1, நொ ×1, லோ ×1
11 points: ஞ ×1, டீ ×1, லீ ×1, னோ×1, கௌ ×1
12 points: ணீ ×1, யீ ×1, டூ ×1, சௌ×1, பௌ ×1
13 points: ஃ ×1, னீ ×1, ரெ ×1, லெ ×1, மௌ ×1
14 points: ஔ ×1, லூ ×1, டே ×1, ரொ ×1, டோ ×1
15 points: வூ ×1, னே ×1, நை ×1, வோ×1, தௌ ×1
16 points: ளூ ×1, னூ ×1, டெ ×1, ளெ ×1, வொ ×1
17 points: ணூ ×1, ணெ ×1, டொ ×1, ளோ×1, றோ ×1
18 points: ளீ ×1, றூ ×1, னெ ×1, லொ ×1, ணோ ×1
19 points: றீ ×1, ணே ×1, ளே ×1, றே ×1, யொ ×1
20 points: றெ ×1, ளொ ×1, றொ ×1, னொ ×1, வௌ ×1

Tamil scrabble is played on a 45×45 board (or a 15×15×15 board in 3D), and 20 tiles are on a rack at a time (but can be lowered to as low as 15 for experts). Note that ங, ஙா, ஙி, ஙீ, ஙு, ஙூ, ஙெ, ஙே, ஙை, ஙொ, ஙோ, ஙௌ, ஞி, ஞீ, ஞு, ஞூ, ஞெ, ஞே, ஞை, ஞொ, ஞோ, ஞௌ, டௌ, ணொ, ணௌ, நௌ, யௌ, ரௌ, லௌ, ழீ, ழூ, ழெ, ழே, ழொ, ழோ, ழௌ, ளௌ, றௌ and னௌ have no tiles because they are very rare in Tamil; these letters can still be played with a blank. Also, ஸ், ஸ, ஸா, ஸி, ஸீ, ஸு, ஸூ, ஸெ, ஸே, ஸை, ஸொ, ஸோ, ஸௌ, ஜ், ஜ, ஜா, ஜி, ஜீ, ஜு, ஜூ, ஜெ, ஜே, ஜை, ஜொ, ஜோ, ஜௌ, ஷ், ஷ, ஷா, ஷி, ஷீ, ஷு, ஷூ, ஷெ, ஷே, ஷை, ஷொ, ஷோ, ஷௌ, ஹ், ஹ, ஹா, ஹி, ஹீ, ஹு, ஹூ, ஹெ, ஹே, ஹை, ஹொ, ஹோ, ஹௌ, க்ஷ், க்ஷ, க்ஷா, க்ஷி, க்ஷீ, க்ஷு, க்ஷூ, க்ஷெ, க்ஷே, க்ஷை, க்ஷொ, க்ஷோ, க்ஷௌ and ஶ்ரீ have no tiles because these are only used in Sanskrit loanwords; these letters can still be played with a blank. ஶ், ஶ, ஶா, ஶி, ஶீ, ஶு, ஶூ, ஶெ, ஶே, ஶை, ஶொ, ஶோ and ஶௌ have no tiles because these are only used in very few Sanskrit loanwords, but can still be played with a blank. Tamil Scrabble can be also played with smaller boards with smaller letter sets (with as low as 15 tiles on the rack, depending on the set) or with larger boards with larger letter sets.

Tswana

The Tswana editions use these 102 tiles:

2 blank tiles (scoring 0 points)
1 point:  A ×16, E ×12, O ×10, L ×7, G ×6, N ×6,  T ×6
2 points: I ×5, S ×5
3 points: K ×4, M ×4
5 points: B ×3, H ×3, R ×3, D ×2, W ×2
8 points: F ×1, P ×1, U ×1, Y ×1
10 points: J ×1, Š ×1

The letters C, Q, V, X, and Z have no tiles as these letters are rarely used in Tswana. However, they can still be played with a blank. Note that Ê and Ô have no tiles because these are now usually written without the circumflex.

Prior to December 4, 2016, Tswana versions used a slightly different set using 104 tiles. There was no Š tile, there were 11 O&apos;s and 9 L&apos;s, the S was worth only 1 point, and the B was worth only 4 points.

Tuvan

Tuvan-language Scrabble sets, which use Cyrillic letters, use these 125 tiles:

 1 blank tile (scoring 0 points)
 1 hyphen tile (scoring 0 points)
1 point: А ×12, Р ×8, Ы ×8, Н ×7, Д ×6, Е ×6, Л ×6, Г ×5, К ×5, Т ×5, И ×4, У ×4
2 points: М ×3, О ×3, П ×3, С ×3, Ү ×3, Ч ×3, Ш ×2
3 points: АА ×2, Б ×2, З ×2, Й ×2, Ң ×2, Э ×2
4 points: В ×1, Ж ×1, Ө ×1, Х ×1, ЭЭ ×1
5 points: ОО ×1, УУ ×1, ЫЫ ×1, Я ×1
6 points: ИИ ×1, ӨӨ ×1, ҮҮ ×1
8 points: Ъ ×1
10 points: Ё ×1, Ю ×1

The distribution lacks four letters used only in loanwords: Ф, Ц, Щ, and Ь.

Vietnamese

Vietnamese editions, called Vietboard, use these 209 tiles:

6 blank tiles (scoring 0 points)
1 point:  N ×20, H ×14, T ×13, A ×6, E ×6, I ×6, O ×6, U ×6, Á ×1, À ×1, Ã ×1, Ạ ×1, Ả ×1, Ă ×1, Ắ ×1, Ằ ×1, Ẳ ×1, Ặ ×1, Ẵ ×1, Â ×1, Ấ ×1, Ầ ×1, Ẩ ×1, Ậ ×1, Ẫ ×1, É ×1, È ×1, Ẻ ×1, Ẹ ×1, Ẽ ×1, Ê ×1, Ề ×1, Ế ×1, Ể ×1, Ệ ×1, Ễ ×1, Í ×1, Ì ×1, Ĩ ×1, Ỉ ×1, Ị ×1, Ó ×1, Ò ×1, Ỏ ×1, Ọ ×1, Õ ×1, Ô ×1, Ố ×1, Ồ ×1, Ổ ×1, Ộ ×1, Ỗ ×1, Ơ ×1, Ớ ×1, Ờ ×1, Ở ×1, Ợ ×1, Ỡ ×1, Ú ×1, Ù ×1, Ủ ×1, Ụ ×1, Ũ ×1, Ư ×1, Ứ ×1, Ừ ×1, Ử ×1, Ự ×1, Ữ ×1, Ý ×1, Ỳ ×1, Ỹ ×1, Ỷ ×1, Ỵ ×1
2 points: C ×7, G ×7, M ×7
4 points: B ×5, D ×5, Đ ×5, L ×5
5 points: K ×4, P ×3, R ×3
8 points: S ×2, X ×2, Y ×2
10 points: Q ×2, V ×2

Note that F, J, W, and Z have no tiles because these letters are not used in Vietnamese. 8 tiles are on a rack instead of the standard 7.

Zhuyin

Zhuyin Chinese-language editions of Scrabble use these 100 tiles:

2 blank tiles (scoring 0 points)
1 point: ㄧ (I) ×13, ㄨ (U) ×10
4 points: ㄉ (D) ×8, ㄜ (E) ×5, ㄢ (AN) ×5, ㄥ (ENG) ×5,
5 points: ㄐ (J) ×4, ㄚ (A) ×4, ㄠ (AO) ×4, ㄣ (EN) ×3
6 points: ㄊ (T) ×3, ㄌ (L) ×3, ㄏ (H) ×3, ㄕ (SH) ×3, ㄅ (B) ×2, ㄒ (X) ×2, ㄓ (ZH) ×2, ㄩ (Ü) ×2, ㄟ (EI) ×2, ㄤ (ANG) ×2
7 points: ㄍ (G) ×2, ㄛ (O) ×2, ㄡ (OU) ×2, ㄞ (AI) ×1
8 points: ㄇ (M) ×1, ㄋ (N) ×1, ㄑ (Q) ×1, ㄖ (R) ×1, ㄗ (Z) ×1, ㄝ (Ê) ×1

The letters ㄘ (C), ㄔ (CH), ㄈ (F), ㄎ (K), ㄆ (P), and ㄙ (S) are used in Zhuyin, but so infrequently that they have no tiles.

Semi-official Editions

These editions are not created/licensed by Hasbro or Mattel, but by another game company.

Cross Dices (Spanish Edition)

Cross Dices is a game that involves 14 lettered dice (6 for each face of the dice). You throw the dice and form as many linked words as possible within 1–2 minutes. It was created by Cayro, The Games. The 84 total faces distribute as it follows:

1 Cayro face (scoring 0 points)
1 point: A ×8, E ×8, I ×5, L ×5, O ×5, S ×5, U ×5, R ×4, T ×4, N ×4
2 points: D ×4, G ×2
3 points: C ×3, M ×3, P ×3, F ×3,  B ×2, Q ×1
4 points: H ×2, V ×2, Y ×1
5 points: K ×1
8 points: J ×1, X ×1
10 points: Z ×1

W and Ñ are absent because Ñ is only used in the Spanish language and W is only used in loanwords. The letter K is also used only in loanwords (and also in sensational spellings), but it's not so rare, so it's included.

References

External links
Spreadsheet issued by Spear's.
More information on Scrabble in these languages can be found at the Wordgame Programmers site.

Quantitative linguistics
Scrabble